This is a partial list of unnumbered minor planets for principal provisional designations assigned between 16 September and 15 October 1999. , a total of 457 bodies remain unnumbered for this period. Objects for this year are listed on the following pages: A–R · S–T and U–Y. Also see previous and next year.

S 

|- id="1999 SN" bgcolor=#d6d6d6
| 0 || 1999 SN || MBA-O || 16.69 || 2.6 km || multiple || 1999–2021 || 29 Oct 2021 || 122 || align=left | Disc.: SpacewatchAdded on 24 August 2020Alt.: 2015 MQ97 || 
|- id="1999 SO" bgcolor=#fefefe
| 0 || 1999 SO || MBA-I || 18.98 || data-sort-value="0.54" | 500 m || multiple || 1999–2022 || 29 Nov 2022 || 36 || align=left | Disc.: SpacewatchAdded on 11 May 2021Alt.: 2014 PS86 || 
|- id="1999 SF1" bgcolor=#fefefe
| 0 ||  || MBA-I || 18.1 || data-sort-value="0.71" | 710 m || multiple || 1999–2020 || 26 Jan 2020 || 50 || align=left | Disc.: Prescott Obs. || 
|- id="1999 SK1" bgcolor=#fefefe
| 2 ||  || MBA-I || 19.0 || data-sort-value="0.47" | 470 m || multiple || 1999–2019 || 24 Aug 2019 || 43 || align=left | Disc.: NRC || 
|- id="1999 SK5" bgcolor=#FA8072
| 0 ||  || MCA || 18.19 || data-sort-value="0.68" | 680 m || multiple || 1999-2022 || 02 Dec 2022 || 96 || align=left | Disc.: LINEAR Alt.: 2022 SV2 || 
|- id="1999 SE10" bgcolor=#FFC2E0
| 0 ||  || AMO || 20.35 || data-sort-value="0.36" | 310 m || multiple || 1999-2022 || 11 Oct 2022 || 110 || align=left | Disc.: LINEAR || 
|- id="1999 SF10" bgcolor=#FFC2E0
| 1 ||  || APO || 24.3 || data-sort-value="0.049" | 49 m || multiple || 1999–2012 || 10 Dec 2012 || 54 || align=left | Disc.: LINEAR || 
|- id="1999 SG10" bgcolor=#FFC2E0
| 2 ||  || APO || 20.5 || data-sort-value="0.28" | 280 m || multiple || 1999–2020 || 20 Oct 2020 || 115 || align=left | Disc.: LINEARPotentially hazardous object || 
|- id="1999 SH10" bgcolor=#FFC2E0
| 0 ||  || APO || 22.73 || data-sort-value="0.10" | 100 m || multiple || 1999–2022 || 06 Jan 2022 || 85 || align=left | Disc.: LINEAR || 
|- id="1999 SJ10" bgcolor=#FFC2E0
| 0 ||  || APO || 19.79 || data-sort-value="0.39" | 390 m || multiple || 1999–2021 || 04 Sep 2021 || 76 || align=left | Disc.: LINEAR || 
|- id="1999 SK10" bgcolor=#FFC2E0
| 0 ||  || APO || 19.84 || data-sort-value="0.38" | 380 m || multiple || 1999–2021 || 07 Apr 2021 || 490 || align=left | Disc.: Spacewatch || 
|- id="1999 SL13" bgcolor=#E9E9E9
| 0 ||  || MBA-M || 17.44 || 1.8 km || multiple || 1999–2021 || 01 Nov 2021 || 125 || align=left | Disc.: SpacewatchAlt.: 2008 SY58 || 
|- id="1999 ST20" bgcolor=#fefefe
| 0 ||  || MBA-I || 18.1 || data-sort-value="0.71" | 710 m || multiple || 1999–2021 || 08 Jun 2021 || 79 || align=left | Disc.: SpacewatchAlt.: 2009 UU94 || 
|- id="1999 SL21" bgcolor=#fefefe
| 0 ||  = (619178) || MBA-I || 18.1 || data-sort-value="0.71" | 710 m || multiple || 1999–2021 || 08 Jun 2021 || 61 || align=left | Disc.: Spacewatch || 
|- id="1999 SE23" bgcolor=#E9E9E9
| 0 ||  || MBA-M || 17.12 || 1.6 km || multiple || 1999–2021 || 08 Dec 2021 || 110 || align=left | Disc.: SpacewatchAdded on 22 July 2020Alt.: 2006 DA180 || 
|- id="1999 SZ23" bgcolor=#E9E9E9
| 4 ||  || MBA-M || 17.9 || 1.5 km || multiple || 1999–2006 || 28 Apr 2006 || 14 || align=left | Disc.: SpacewatchAlt.: 2006 HX143 || 
|- id="1999 SB25" bgcolor=#FA8072
| 1 ||  || MCA || 18.0 || data-sort-value="0.75" | 750 m || multiple || 1999–2020 || 01 Feb 2020 || 50 || align=left | Disc.: CSSAlt.: 2009 WY15 || 
|- id="1999 SM25" bgcolor=#E9E9E9
| 0 ||  || MBA-M || 18.1 || 1.0 km || multiple || 1999–2021 || 08 Nov 2021 || 35 || align=left | Disc.: SpacewatchAdded on 24 December 2021 || 
|- id="1999 SA28" bgcolor=#C2E0FF
| E ||  || TNO || 7.3 || 164 km || single || 1 day || 17 Sep 1999 || 6 || align=left | Disc.: Mauna Kea Obs.LoUTNOs, plutino? || 
|- id="1999 SY28" bgcolor=#fefefe
| 0 ||  || MBA-I || 18.09 || data-sort-value="0.72" | 720 m || multiple || 1999–2020 || 13 Jul 2020 || 96 || align=left | Disc.: Spacewatch || 
|- id="1999 SZ28" bgcolor=#fefefe
| 0 ||  || MBA-I || 18.1 || data-sort-value="0.71" | 710 m || multiple || 1999–2020 || 15 Oct 2020 || 90 || align=left | Disc.: Spacewatch || 
|- id="1999 SA29" bgcolor=#fefefe
| 0 ||  || MBA-I || 18.5 || data-sort-value="0.59" | 590 m || multiple || 1999–2019 || 10 Jan 2019 || 50 || align=left | Disc.: Spacewatch || 
|- id="1999 SB29" bgcolor=#fefefe
| 0 ||  || MBA-I || 18.5 || data-sort-value="0.59" | 590 m || multiple || 1999–2020 || 16 Aug 2020 || 71 || align=left | Disc.: Spacewatch || 
|- id="1999 SC29" bgcolor=#E9E9E9
| 0 ||  || MBA-M || 17.29 || 1.9 km || multiple || 1999–2021 || 31 Jul 2021 || 73 || align=left | Disc.: Spacewatch || 
|- id="1999 SD29" bgcolor=#d6d6d6
| 0 ||  || MBA-O || 16.94 || 2.3 km || multiple || 1999–2021 || 30 May 2021 || 56 || align=left | Disc.: Spacewatch || 
|- id="1999 SE29" bgcolor=#fefefe
| 0 ||  || MBA-I || 19.0 || data-sort-value="0.47" | 470 m || multiple || 1999–2019 || 27 Oct 2019 || 37 || align=left | Disc.: Spacewatch || 
|- id="1999 SF29" bgcolor=#fefefe
| 0 ||  || MBA-I || 17.93 || data-sort-value="0.77" | 770 m || multiple || 1999–2021 || 31 Mar 2021 || 76 || align=left | Disc.: Spacewatch || 
|- id="1999 SH29" bgcolor=#fefefe
| 0 ||  || MBA-I || 18.4 || data-sort-value="0.62" | 620 m || multiple || 1999–2021 || 06 Jan 2021 || 99 || align=left | Disc.: Spacewatch || 
|- id="1999 SJ29" bgcolor=#fefefe
| 0 ||  = (619179) || MBA-I || 18.1 || data-sort-value="0.71" | 710 m || multiple || 1999–2021 || 05 Jun 2021 || 75 || align=left | Disc.: Spacewatch || 
|- id="1999 SK29" bgcolor=#fefefe
| 1 ||  || HUN || 18.9 || data-sort-value="0.49" | 490 m || multiple || 1999–2019 || 31 May 2019 || 49 || align=left | Disc.: Spacewatch || 
|- id="1999 SL29" bgcolor=#E9E9E9
| 0 ||  || MBA-M || 17.70 || 1.2 km || multiple || 1999–2021 || 11 Oct 2021 || 88 || align=left | Disc.: Spacewatch || 
|- id="1999 SM29" bgcolor=#fefefe
| 0 ||  || MBA-I || 18.58 || data-sort-value="0.57" | 570 m || multiple || 1999–2021 || 27 Oct 2021 || 96 || align=left | Disc.: Spacewatch || 
|- id="1999 SN29" bgcolor=#fefefe
| 1 ||  || MBA-I || 18.4 || data-sort-value="0.62" | 620 m || multiple || 1999–2019 || 22 Aug 2019 || 43 || align=left | Disc.: Spacewatch || 
|- id="1999 SO29" bgcolor=#fefefe
| 0 ||  || MBA-I || 18.85 || data-sort-value="0.50" | 500 m || multiple || 1999–2021 || 05 Nov 2021 || 91 || align=left | Disc.: Spacewatch || 
|- id="1999 SP29" bgcolor=#E9E9E9
| 0 ||  || MBA-M || 18.19 || data-sort-value="0.97" | 970 m || multiple || 1999–2022 || 25 Jan 2022 || 36 || align=left | Disc.: Spacewatch || 
|- id="1999 SQ29" bgcolor=#E9E9E9
| 0 ||  || MBA-M || 17.81 || 1.5 km || multiple || 1999–2021 || 31 Aug 2021 || 49 || align=left | Disc.: Spacewatch Added on 17 June 2021 || 
|}
back to top

T 

|- id="1999 TT2" bgcolor=#FA8072
| 1 ||  || MCA || 18.8 || data-sort-value="0.52" | 520 m || multiple || 1999–2019 || 02 Jan 2019 || 90 || align=left | Disc.: SpacewatchAlt.: 2018 RE36 || 
|- id="1999 TY2" bgcolor=#FFC2E0
| 5 ||  || APO || 23.3 || data-sort-value="0.078" | 78 m || single || 5 days || 08 Oct 1999 || 114 || align=left | Disc.: CSS || 
|- id="1999 TE3" bgcolor=#d6d6d6
| 0 ||  || MBA-O || 16.9 || 2.3 km || multiple || 1999-2021 || 11 Oct 2021 || 95 || align=left | Disc.: Prescott Obs.Alt.: 2010 OS125 || 
|- id="1999 TR4" bgcolor=#FA8072
| 1 ||  || HUN || 18.3 || data-sort-value="0.65" | 650 m || multiple || 1999–2020 || 09 Dec 2020 || 204 || align=left | Disc.: LINEAR || 
|- id="1999 TA5" bgcolor=#FFC2E0
| 5 ||  || AMO || 20.6 || data-sort-value="0.27" | 270 m || single || 40 days || 12 Nov 1999 || 50 || align=left | Disc.: CSS || 
|- id="1999 TD5" bgcolor=#FFC2E0
| 0 ||  || AMO || 19.4 || data-sort-value="0.47" | 470 m || multiple || 1999–2022 || 28 Jul 2022 || 161 || align=left | Disc.: LINEAR || 
|- id="1999 TE5" bgcolor=#FFC2E0
| 2 ||  || AMO || 20.5 || data-sort-value="0.28" | 280 m || multiple || 1999–2009 || 22 Oct 2009 || 71 || align=left | Disc.: LINEAR || 
|- id="1999 TR11" bgcolor=#C2E0FF
| 4 ||  || TNO || 8.4 || 99 km || multiple || 1999–2000 || 28 Dec 2000 || 25 || align=left | Disc.: Mauna Kea Obs.LoUTNOs, plutino, BR-mag: 1.77; taxonomy: RR || 
|- id="1999 TJ12" bgcolor=#FA8072
| 0 ||  || MCA || 18.28 || data-sort-value="0.66" | 660 m || multiple || 1999–2017 || 23 Dec 2017 || 190 || align=left | Disc.: LINEAR || 
|- id="1999 TM12" bgcolor=#FFC2E0
| 8 ||  || APO || 21.6 || data-sort-value="0.17" | 170 m || single || 7 days || 17 Oct 1999 || 43 || align=left | Disc.: LINEAR || 
|- id="1999 TM13" bgcolor=#FFC2E0
| 8 ||  || AMO || 23.7 || data-sort-value="0.065" | 65 m || single || 13 days || 18 Oct 1999 || 26 || align=left | Disc.: LINEAR || 
|- id="1999 TN13" bgcolor=#FFC2E0
| 5 ||  || APO || 23.6 || data-sort-value="0.068" | 68 m || single || 7 days || 18 Oct 1999 || 65 || align=left | Disc.: LINEAR || 
|- id="1999 TO13" bgcolor=#FFC2E0
| 7 ||  || APO || 21.4 || data-sort-value="0.19" | 190 m || single || 11 days || 23 Oct 1999 || 98 || align=left | Disc.: LINEARPotentially hazardous object || 
|- id="1999 TL16" bgcolor=#E9E9E9
| 0 ||  || MBA-M || 17.03 || 1.2 km || multiple || 1990-2022 || 09 Apr 2022 || 57 || align=left | Disc.: Ondřejov Obs. Alt.: 2014 GG96 || 
|- id="1999 TT16" bgcolor=#FFC2E0
| 0 ||  || APO || 19.77 || data-sort-value="0.39" | 390 m || multiple || 1999–2019 || 27 May 2019 || 194 || align=left | Disc.: SpacewatchPotentially hazardous object || 
|- id="1999 TU16" bgcolor=#FFC2E0
| 7 ||  || AMO || 22.1 || data-sort-value="0.14" | 140 m || single || 19 days || 30 Oct 1999 || 28 || align=left | Disc.: Spacewatch || 
|- id="1999 TV16" bgcolor=#FFC2E0
| 6 ||  || APO || 23.4 || data-sort-value="0.074" | 74 m || single || 6 days || 18 Oct 1999 || 64 || align=left | Disc.: LINEAR || 
|- id="1999 TW16" bgcolor=#FFC2E0
| 0 ||  || APO || 19.51 || data-sort-value="0.45" | 450 m || multiple || 1999–2021 || 03 Dec 2021 || 196 || align=left | Disc.: LINEAR || 
|- id="1999 TE21" bgcolor=#fefefe
| 0 ||  || HUN || 18.39 || data-sort-value="0.62" | 620 m || multiple || 1999–2021 || 17 Apr 2021 || 228 || align=left | Disc.: Spacewatch || 
|- id="1999 TT21" bgcolor=#fefefe
| 0 ||  || MBA-I || 17.51 || data-sort-value="0.94" | 940 m || multiple || 1999–2021 || 16 Apr 2021 || 69 || align=left | Disc.: Spacewatch || 
|- id="1999 TC22" bgcolor=#d6d6d6
| 0 ||  || MBA-O || 17.12 || 2.1 km || multiple || 1999–2021 || 31 Aug 2021 || 62 || align=left | Disc.: Spacewatch || 
|- id="1999 TM23" bgcolor=#FA8072
| 4 ||  || MCA || 19.7 || data-sort-value="0.34" | 340 m || multiple || 1999–2019 || 02 Nov 2019 || 27 || align=left | Disc.: SpacewatchAdded on 17 June 2021Alt.: 2009 SN405 || 
|- id="1999 TS23" bgcolor=#E9E9E9
| E ||  || MBA-M || 17.9 || 1.5 km || single || 4 days || 07 Oct 1999 || 9 || align=left | Disc.: LINEAR || 
|- id="1999 TB24" bgcolor=#fefefe
| 4 ||  || MBA-I || 19.1 || data-sort-value="0.45" | 450 m || multiple || 1999–2021 || 30 Nov 2021 || 36 || align=left | Disc.: LINEAR || 
|- id="1999 TE24" bgcolor=#fefefe
| 2 ||  || MBA-I || 19.0 || data-sort-value="0.47" | 470 m || multiple || 1999–2020 || 14 Sep 2020 || 57 || align=left | Disc.: LINEARAlt.: 2013 RQ25 || 
|- id="1999 TP24" bgcolor=#fefefe
| 0 ||  || MBA-I || 18.6 || data-sort-value="0.57" | 570 m || multiple || 1999–2018 || 11 Nov 2018 || 63 || align=left | Disc.: LINEARAlt.: 2012 CY19, 2014 QD494 || 
|- id="1999 TS33" bgcolor=#FA8072
| 2 ||  || MCA || 18.3 || data-sort-value="0.92" | 920 m || multiple || 1999–2021 || 11 Jan 2021 || 180 || align=left | Disc.: LINEAR || 
|- id="1999 TL38" bgcolor=#fefefe
| 0 ||  || MBA-I || 17.7 || data-sort-value="0.86" | 860 m || multiple || 1997–2020 || 15 Aug 2020 || 127 || align=left | Disc.: CSSAlt.: 2006 QQ35 || 
|- id="1999 TB41" bgcolor=#E9E9E9
| 0 ||  || MBA-M || 18.3 || data-sort-value="0.92" | 920 m || multiple || 1999–2020 || 11 Sep 2020 || 42 || align=left | Disc.: Spacewatch || 
|- id="1999 TE42" bgcolor=#E9E9E9
| 2 ||  || MBA-M || 17.5 || data-sort-value="0.94" | 940 m || multiple || 1999–2020 || 16 Nov 2020 || 140 || align=left | Disc.: Spacewatch || 
|- id="1999 TF42" bgcolor=#d6d6d6
| 0 ||  || MBA-O || 16.77 || 2.5 km || multiple || 1999–2021 || 07 Sep 2021 || 72 || align=left | Disc.: SpacewatchAlt.: 2016 UX18 || 
|- id="1999 TV42" bgcolor=#d6d6d6
| 0 ||  || MBA-O || 17.3 || 1.9 km || multiple || 1999–2020 || 17 Oct 2020 || 66 || align=left | Disc.: Spacewatch || 
|- id="1999 TY42" bgcolor=#fefefe
| 0 ||  || MBA-I || 18.0 || data-sort-value="0.75" | 750 m || multiple || 1999–2020 || 23 Aug 2020 || 64 || align=left | Disc.: SpacewatchAlt.: 2016 GZ242 || 
|- id="1999 TC43" bgcolor=#d6d6d6
| 0 ||  || MBA-O || 17.3 || 1.9 km || multiple || 1999–2019 || 24 Dec 2019 || 94 || align=left | Disc.: SpacewatchAlt.: 1999 TH257, 2004 TW215, 2011 BP129, 2014 WJ561, 2017 HT37 || 
|- id="1999 TK43" bgcolor=#E9E9E9
| 0 ||  || MBA-M || 17.3 || 1.5 km || multiple || 1999–2020 || 11 Oct 2020 || 117 || align=left | Disc.: Spacewatch || 
|- id="1999 TN43" bgcolor=#E9E9E9
| 0 ||  || MBA-M || 17.9 || 1.1 km || multiple || 1999–2016 || 25 Oct 2016 || 66 || align=left | Disc.: SpacewatchAlt.: 2012 TZ117 || 
|- id="1999 TS43" bgcolor=#d6d6d6
| 0 ||  || MBA-O || 17.26 || 2.0 km || multiple || 1999–2021 || 09 Apr 2021 || 67 || align=left | Disc.: SpacewatchAlt.: 2011 BR148 || 
|- id="1999 TT43" bgcolor=#fefefe
| 2 ||  || MBA-I || 18.7 || data-sort-value="0.54" | 540 m || multiple || 1999–2018 || 17 Nov 2018 || 36 || align=left | Disc.: Spacewatch || 
|- id="1999 TV43" bgcolor=#FA8072
| 4 ||  || MCA || 19.1 || data-sort-value="0.45" | 450 m || multiple || 1999–2016 || 10 Nov 2016 || 21 || align=left | Disc.: SpacewatchAdded on 19 October 2020 || 
|- id="1999 TW43" bgcolor=#E9E9E9
| 0 ||  || MBA-M || 17.59 || 1.7 km || multiple || 1999–2021 || 04 Oct 2021 || 92 || align=left | Disc.: Spacewatch || 
|- id="1999 TB44" bgcolor=#fefefe
| 4 ||  || MBA-I || 18.9 || data-sort-value="0.49" | 490 m || multiple || 1999–2017 || 22 Nov 2017 || 24 || align=left | Disc.: Spacewatch || 
|- id="1999 TK44" bgcolor=#d6d6d6
| 0 ||  || MBA-O || 16.57 || 2.7 km || multiple || 1999–2021 || 06 Nov 2021 || 156 || align=left | Disc.: SpacewatchAlt.: 2015 VW4, 2019 GG13 || 
|- id="1999 TT44" bgcolor=#E9E9E9
| 0 ||  || MBA-M || 18.4 || data-sort-value="0.62" | 620 m || multiple || 1995–2020 || 11 Dec 2020 || 42 || align=left | Disc.: Spacewatch Added on 11 May 2021Alt.: 2003 SS468 || 
|- id="1999 TZ44" bgcolor=#E9E9E9
| 0 ||  || MBA-M || 17.49 || 1.8 km || multiple || 1999–2021 || 11 Jun 2021 || 67 || align=left | Disc.: Spacewatch || 
|- id="1999 TD45" bgcolor=#fefefe
| 1 ||  || MBA-I || 19.13 || data-sort-value="0.44" | 440 m || multiple || 1999–2021 || 07 Nov 2021 || 56 || align=left | Disc.: SpacewatchAlt.: 2010 UX39 || 
|- id="1999 TP45" bgcolor=#E9E9E9
| 1 ||  || MBA-M || 17.6 || 1.3 km || multiple || 1999–2020 || 14 Nov 2020 || 137 || align=left | Disc.: SpacewatchAlt.: 2016 TW137 || 
|- id="1999 TQ45" bgcolor=#fefefe
| 0 ||  || MBA-I || 18.89 || data-sort-value="0.50" | 500 m || multiple || 1999–2021 || 25 Nov 2021 || 61 || align=left | Disc.: Spacewatch || 
|- id="1999 TV45" bgcolor=#d6d6d6
| 0 ||  || MBA-O || 17.18 || 2.0 km || multiple || 1999–2021 || 10 Sep 2021 || 48 || align=left | Disc.: Spacewatch || 
|- id="1999 TE46" bgcolor=#fefefe
| 3 ||  || MBA-I || 18.6 || data-sort-value="0.57" | 570 m || multiple || 1999–2020 || 16 Aug 2020 || 25 || align=left | Disc.: Spacewatch || 
|- id="1999 TJ46" bgcolor=#fefefe
| 0 ||  || MBA-I || 18.0 || data-sort-value="0.75" | 750 m || multiple || 1999–2019 || 27 Oct 2019 || 97 || align=left | Disc.: SpacewatchAlt.: 2015 FQ232 || 
|- id="1999 TK46" bgcolor=#fefefe
| 2 ||  || MBA-I || 19.3 || data-sort-value="0.41" | 410 m || multiple || 1999–2019 || 29 Sep 2019 || 30 || align=left | Disc.: SpacewatchAdded on 17 January 2021 || 
|- id="1999 TS46" bgcolor=#fefefe
| 0 ||  || MBA-I || 18.10 || data-sort-value="0.71" | 710 m || multiple || 1999–2021 || 14 Sep 2021 || 80 || align=left | Disc.: Spacewatch || 
|- id="1999 TT46" bgcolor=#d6d6d6
| 0 ||  || MBA-O || 17.39 || 1.9 km || multiple || 1999–2021 || 30 Oct 2021 || 126 || align=left | Disc.: SpacewatchAlt.: 2010 NO35 || 
|- id="1999 TB47" bgcolor=#fefefe
| 0 ||  || MBA-I || 18.9 || data-sort-value="0.49" | 490 m || multiple || 1999–2018 || 18 Aug 2018 || 37 || align=left | Disc.: SpacewatchAlt.: 2015 VO23 || 
|- id="1999 TH47" bgcolor=#fefefe
| 0 ||  || MBA-I || 18.58 || data-sort-value="0.57" | 570 m || multiple || 1999–2021 || 30 Nov 2021 || 76 || align=left | Disc.: SpacewatchAdded on 5 November 2021 || 
|- id="1999 TM47" bgcolor=#E9E9E9
| 0 ||  || MBA-M || 17.8 || 1.2 km || multiple || 1999–2021 || 14 Nov 2021 || 75 || align=left | Disc.: SpacewatchAlt.: 1999 TV334 || 
|- id="1999 TN47" bgcolor=#d6d6d6
| 0 ||  || MBA-O || 17.5 || 1.8 km || multiple || 1999–2021 || 30 Nov 2021 || 54 || align=left | Disc.: SpacewatchAdded on 29 January 2022 || 
|- id="1999 TT47" bgcolor=#d6d6d6
| 1 ||  || MBA-O || 18.21 || 1.3 km || multiple || 1999–2021 || 25 Nov 2021 || 33 || align=left | Disc.: SpacewatchAdded on 24 December 2021 || 
|- id="1999 TZ47" bgcolor=#fefefe
| 0 ||  || MBA-I || 18.2 || data-sort-value="0.68" | 680 m || multiple || 1995–2018 || 11 Aug 2018 || 42 || align=left | Disc.: SpacewatchAlt.: 2018 PZ || 
|- id="1999 TA48" bgcolor=#E9E9E9
| 0 ||  || MBA-M || 17.9 || data-sort-value="0.78" | 780 m || multiple || 1999–2020 || 23 Nov 2020 || 31 || align=left | Disc.: Spacewatch Added on 11 May 2021Alt.: 2011 OH31 || 
|- id="1999 TU48" bgcolor=#E9E9E9
| 0 ||  || MBA-M || 17.36 || 1.4 km || multiple || 1999–2021 || 10 Oct 2021 || 123 || align=left | Disc.: SpacewatchAlt.: 2006 CB35, 2015 DX55 || 
|- id="1999 TV48" bgcolor=#d6d6d6
| 0 ||  || MBA-O || 16.76 || 2.5 km || multiple || 1999–2021 || 30 Nov 2021 || 121 || align=left | Disc.: Spacewatch || 
|- id="1999 TD49" bgcolor=#E9E9E9
| 0 ||  || MBA-M || 18.14 || data-sort-value="0.99" | 990 m || multiple || 1999–2021 || 29 Nov 2021 || 65 || align=left | Disc.: Spacewatch || 
|- id="1999 TU49" bgcolor=#E9E9E9
| 0 ||  || MBA-M || 17.94 || 1.4 km || multiple || 1999–2021 || 26 Oct 2021 || 71 || align=left | Disc.: Spacewatch || 
|- id="1999 TB50" bgcolor=#E9E9E9
| 0 ||  || MBA-M || 18.2 || data-sort-value="0.68" | 680 m || multiple || 1995–2020 || 08 Dec 2020 || 43 || align=left | Disc.: SpacewatchAlt.: 1995 US74, 2014 EE65 || 
|- id="1999 TF50" bgcolor=#fefefe
| 0 ||  || MBA-I || 18.51 || data-sort-value="0.59" | 590 m || multiple || 1999–2021 || 24 Oct 2021 || 114 || align=left | Disc.: SpacewatchAdded on 19 October 2020 || 
|- id="1999 TJ50" bgcolor=#E9E9E9
| 1 ||  || MBA-M || 18.61 || 1.1 km || multiple || 1999–2021 || 04 Aug 2021 || 30 || align=left | Disc.: SpacewatchAdded on 24 December 2021 || 
|- id="1999 TO50" bgcolor=#d6d6d6
| 0 ||  || MBA-O || 17.0 || 2.2 km || multiple || 1999–2021 || 09 Jan 2021 || 77 || align=left | Disc.: SpacewatchAlt.: 2004 RR134 || 
|- id="1999 TP50" bgcolor=#E9E9E9
| – ||  || MBA-M || 19.2 || data-sort-value="0.43" | 430 m || single || 12 days || 16 Oct 1999 || 8 || align=left | Disc.: Spacewatch || 
|- id="1999 TX50" bgcolor=#d6d6d6
| 0 ||  || MBA-O || 16.6 || 2.7 km || multiple || 1999–2020 || 26 Apr 2020 || 42 || align=left | Disc.: SpacewatchAlt.: 2005 TV93 || 
|- id="1999 TE51" bgcolor=#d6d6d6
| 0 ||  || MBA-O || 16.8 || 2.4 km || multiple || 1999–2020 || 16 Oct 2020 || 85 || align=left | Disc.: SpacewatchAlt.: 2009 QU7 || 
|- id="1999 TF51" bgcolor=#d6d6d6
| 2 ||  || MBA-O || 18.2 || 1.3 km || multiple || 1999–2019 || 01 Nov 2019 || 51 || align=left | Disc.: Spacewatch || 
|- id="1999 TH51" bgcolor=#fefefe
| 0 ||  || MBA-I || 18.5 || data-sort-value="0.59" | 590 m || multiple || 1999–2021 || 17 Jan 2021 || 59 || align=left | Disc.: Spacewatch || 
|- id="1999 TU51" bgcolor=#E9E9E9
| 2 ||  || MBA-M || 18.4 || data-sort-value="0.62" | 620 m || multiple || 1999–2019 || 19 Oct 2019 || 33 || align=left | Disc.: SpacewatchAdded on 21 August 2021 || 
|- id="1999 TX51" bgcolor=#E9E9E9
| 0 ||  = (619180) || MBA-M || 17.7 || 1.6 km || multiple || 1999–2020 || 27 Apr 2020 || 57 || align=left | Disc.: Spacewatch || 
|- id="1999 TA52" bgcolor=#fefefe
| 2 ||  || MBA-I || 19.0 || data-sort-value="0.47" | 470 m || multiple || 1999–2020 || 16 Nov 2020 || 79 || align=left | Disc.: SpacewatchAlt.: 2013 RE86 || 
|- id="1999 TB52" bgcolor=#fefefe
| 0 ||  || MBA-I || 18.7 || data-sort-value="0.54" | 540 m || multiple || 1999–2021 || 09 May 2021 || 39 || align=left | Disc.: SpacewatchAdded on 21 August 2021 || 
|- id="1999 TR52" bgcolor=#E9E9E9
| 0 ||  || MBA-M || 17.6 || 1.7 km || multiple || 1999–2021 || 01 Jul 2021 || 54 || align=left | Disc.: SpacewatchAdded on 21 August 2021 || 
|- id="1999 TS52" bgcolor=#d6d6d6
| 0 ||  || MBA-O || 16.48 || 2.8 km || multiple || 1994–2021 || 30 Sep 2021 || 105 || align=left | Disc.: SpacewatchAlt.: 1999 TC323, 2014 KZ55 || 
|- id="1999 TZ53" bgcolor=#fefefe
| 1 ||  || MBA-I || 18.2 || data-sort-value="0.68" | 680 m || multiple || 1999–2021 || 05 Jan 2021 || 134 || align=left | Disc.: Spacewatch || 
|- id="1999 TS54" bgcolor=#E9E9E9
| 1 ||  || MBA-M || 18.1 || 1.0 km || multiple || 1999–2020 || 17 Oct 2020 || 71 || align=left | Disc.: SpacewatchAdded on 19 October 2020 || 
|- id="1999 TV54" bgcolor=#fefefe
| 0 ||  || MBA-I || 17.8 || data-sort-value="0.82" | 820 m || multiple || 1999–2021 || 16 Jan 2021 || 117 || align=left | Disc.: SpacewatchAlt.: 2009 SR306 || 
|- id="1999 TT56" bgcolor=#E9E9E9
| 2 ||  || MBA-M || 18.8 || data-sort-value="0.52" | 520 m || multiple || 1999–2019 || 27 Oct 2019 || 66 || align=left | Disc.: SpacewatchAlt.: 2003 UN44 || 
|- id="1999 TD57" bgcolor=#E9E9E9
| 0 ||  || MBA-M || 17.1 || 1.1 km || multiple || 1999–2021 || 22 Jan 2021 || 123 || align=left | Disc.: SpacewatchAdded on 17 January 2021Alt.: 2015 TJ211 || 
|- id="1999 TT57" bgcolor=#d6d6d6
| 0 ||  || MBA-O || 16.23 || 3.2 km || multiple || 1999–2021 || 11 Aug 2021 || 149 || align=left | Disc.: SpacewatchAlt.: 2010 LP75 || 
|- id="1999 TG58" bgcolor=#E9E9E9
| 0 ||  || MBA-M || 17.1 || 1.1 km || multiple || 1999–2021 || 11 Jan 2021 || 84 || align=left | Disc.: SpacewatchAlt.: 2015 VZ45 || 
|- id="1999 TJ58" bgcolor=#E9E9E9
| 0 ||  || MBA-M || 16.9 || 2.3 km || multiple || 1999–2020 || 16 May 2020 || 64 || align=left | Disc.: Spacewatch || 
|- id="1999 TX58" bgcolor=#d6d6d6
| 0 ||  || MBA-O || 17.11 || 2.1 km || multiple || 1999–2021 || 07 Apr 2021 || 48 || align=left | Disc.: SpacewatchAlt.: 2015 AT221 || 
|- id="1999 TW59" bgcolor=#E9E9E9
| 1 ||  || MBA-M || 17.8 || data-sort-value="0.82" | 820 m || multiple || 1999–2021 || 06 Jan 2021 || 51 || align=left | Disc.: SpacewatchAdded on 22 July 2020Alt.: 2015 KJ16 || 
|- id="1999 TH60" bgcolor=#fefefe
| 2 ||  || MBA-I || 19.1 || data-sort-value="0.45" | 450 m || multiple || 1999–2020 || 06 Dec 2020 || 122 || align=left | Disc.: Spacewatch || 
|- id="1999 TT60" bgcolor=#fefefe
| 2 ||  || MBA-I || 18.8 || data-sort-value="0.52" | 520 m || multiple || 1999–2020 || 17 Dec 2020 || 123 || align=left | Disc.: Spacewatch || 
|- id="1999 TA63" bgcolor=#E9E9E9
| 1 ||  || MBA-M || 17.5 || 1.3 km || multiple || 1999–2021 || 09 Jan 2021 || 57 || align=left | Disc.: Spacewatch || 
|- id="1999 TA64" bgcolor=#fefefe
| 0 ||  || MBA-I || 18.28 || data-sort-value="0.66" | 660 m || multiple || 1999–2021 || 12 Aug 2021 || 115 || align=left | Disc.: Spacewatch || 
|- id="1999 TG64" bgcolor=#E9E9E9
| 0 ||  || MBA-M || 17.8 || data-sort-value="0.82" | 820 m || multiple || 1999–2021 || 06 Jan 2021 || 79 || align=left | Disc.: Spacewatch || 
|- id="1999 TD65" bgcolor=#fefefe
| 2 ||  || MBA-I || 18.9 || data-sort-value="0.49" | 490 m || multiple || 1999–2021 || 18 Jan 2021 || 48 || align=left | Disc.: Spacewatch || 
|- id="1999 TA66" bgcolor=#d6d6d6
| 3 ||  || MBA-O || 17.0 || 2.2 km || multiple || 1999–2021 || 09 Jan 2021 || 33 || align=left | Disc.: SpacewatchAdded on 17 January 2021 || 
|- id="1999 TO66" bgcolor=#fefefe
| 2 ||  || MBA-I || 19.0 || data-sort-value="0.47" | 470 m || multiple || 1999–2020 || 15 Oct 2020 || 64 || align=left | Disc.: SpacewatchAdded on 19 October 2020 || 
|- id="1999 TX66" bgcolor=#E9E9E9
| 0 ||  || MBA-M || 18.4 || data-sort-value="0.88" | 880 m || multiple || 1999–2020 || 14 Sep 2020 || 60 || align=left | Disc.: Spacewatch || 
|- id="1999 TG67" bgcolor=#fefefe
| 0 ||  || MBA-I || 18.50 || data-sort-value="0.59" | 590 m || multiple || 1999–2021 || 08 Aug 2021 || 57 || align=left | Disc.: Spacewatch || 
|- id="1999 TH67" bgcolor=#fefefe
| 0 ||  || MBA-I || 18.3 || data-sort-value="0.65" | 650 m || multiple || 1999–2019 || 25 Sep 2019 || 73 || align=left | Disc.: Spacewatch || 
|- id="1999 TM67" bgcolor=#E9E9E9
| 0 ||  || MBA-M || 17.89 || 1.1 km || multiple || 1999–2021 || 02 Dec 2021 || 71 || align=left | Disc.: SpacewatchAlt.: 2012 TQ181 || 
|- id="1999 TJ68" bgcolor=#d6d6d6
| 0 ||  || MBA-O || 17.17 || 2.0 km || multiple || 1999–2021 || 28 Nov 2021 || 85 || align=left | Disc.: Spacewatch || 
|- id="1999 TK68" bgcolor=#d6d6d6
| 0 ||  || MBA-O || 16.96 || 2.3 km || multiple || 1999–2021 || 09 Sep 2021 || 41 || align=left | Disc.: Spacewatch || 
|- id="1999 TM68" bgcolor=#d6d6d6
| – ||  || MBA-O || 17.1 || 2.1 km || single || 12 days || 14 Oct 1999 || 9 || align=left | Disc.: Spacewatch || 
|- id="1999 TN68" bgcolor=#d6d6d6
| 0 ||  || MBA-O || 17.24 || 2.0 km || multiple || 1999–2021 || 29 Nov 2021 || 84 || align=left | Disc.: SpacewatchAdded on 22 July 2020 || 
|- id="1999 TR68" bgcolor=#d6d6d6
| 0 ||  || MBA-O || 17.38 || 1.9 km || multiple || 1999–2021 || 10 Apr 2021 || 57 || align=left | Disc.: SpacewatchAlt.: 2009 WL214 || 
|- id="1999 TM69" bgcolor=#fefefe
| 2 ||  || MBA-I || 18.0 || data-sort-value="0.75" | 750 m || multiple || 1999–2021 || 30 Jun 2021 || 44 || align=left | Disc.: SpacewatchAlt.: 2007 VT228 || 
|- id="1999 TS69" bgcolor=#fefefe
| 0 ||  || MBA-I || 18.30 || data-sort-value="0.65" | 650 m || multiple || 1999–2021 || 18 May 2021 || 107 || align=left | Disc.: SpacewatchAlt.: 2015 MZ71 || 
|- id="1999 TU69" bgcolor=#fefefe
| 0 ||  || MBA-I || 18.8 || data-sort-value="0.52" | 520 m || multiple || 1999–2019 || 27 Oct 2019 || 141 || align=left | Disc.: SpacewatchAdded on 22 July 2020Alt.: 2015 HP125 || 
|- id="1999 TN70" bgcolor=#E9E9E9
| 0 ||  || MBA-M || 17.6 || 1.3 km || multiple || 1999–2020 || 20 Oct 2020 || 84 || align=left | Disc.: Spacewatch || 
|- id="1999 TU70" bgcolor=#fefefe
| 1 ||  || MBA-I || 18.2 || data-sort-value="0.68" | 680 m || multiple || 1999–2019 || 02 Jan 2019 || 50 || align=left | Disc.: SpacewatchAlt.: 2014 QM406 || 
|- id="1999 TO71" bgcolor=#fefefe
| 1 ||  || MBA-I || 18.9 || data-sort-value="0.49" | 490 m || multiple || 1999–2017 || 27 Nov 2017 || 26 || align=left | Disc.: SpacewatchAdded on 29 January 2022 || 
|- id="1999 TV71" bgcolor=#E9E9E9
| 0 ||  || MBA-M || 17.3 || 1.0 km || multiple || 1999–2021 || 13 Jan 2021 || 235 || align=left | Disc.: Spacewatch || 
|- id="1999 TZ71" bgcolor=#fefefe
| 0 ||  || MBA-I || 19.15 || data-sort-value="0.44" | 440 m || multiple || 1999–2021 || 28 Nov 2021 || 34 || align=left | Disc.: Spacewatch || 
|- id="1999 TG72" bgcolor=#E9E9E9
| 0 ||  || MBA-M || 18.9 || data-sort-value="0.70" | 700 m || multiple || 1999–2020 || 11 Oct 2020 || 47 || align=left | Disc.: Spacewatch || 
|- id="1999 TC73" bgcolor=#fefefe
| 2 ||  || MBA-I || 19.3 || data-sort-value="0.41" | 410 m || multiple || 1999–2020 || 17 Oct 2020 || 49 || align=left | Disc.: SpacewatchAlt.: 2013 RU142 || 
|- id="1999 TR73" bgcolor=#fefefe
| 3 ||  || MBA-I || 19.5 || data-sort-value="0.37" | 370 m || multiple || 1999–2019 || 26 Nov 2019 || 33 || align=left | Disc.: Spacewatch Added on 11 May 2021Alt.: 2009 SH407 || 
|- id="1999 TU73" bgcolor=#d6d6d6
| 0 ||  || MBA-O || 16.69 || 2.6 km || multiple || 1999–2021 || 28 Nov 2021 || 63 || align=left | Disc.: SpacewatchAlt.: 2010 NZ140 || 
|- id="1999 TM74" bgcolor=#fefefe
| 2 ||  || MBA-I || 19.0 || data-sort-value="0.47" | 470 m || multiple || 1999–2020 || 16 Sep 2020 || 66 || align=left | Disc.: SpacewatchAlt.: 2006 SG213 || 
|- id="1999 TQ74" bgcolor=#d6d6d6
| 0 ||  || MBA-O || 16.68 || 2.6 km || multiple || 1999–2021 || 30 Nov 2021 || 110 || align=left | Disc.: SpacewatchAdded on 21 August 2021Alt.: 2010 SU55 || 
|- id="1999 TS74" bgcolor=#E9E9E9
| 0 ||  || MBA-M || 17.39 || 1.9 km || multiple || 1998–2021 || 08 Sep 2021 || 127 || align=left | Disc.: SpacewatchAlt.: 2002 ET156, 2007 HU86 || 
|- id="1999 TW74" bgcolor=#d6d6d6
| 0 ||  || MBA-O || 17.1 || 2.1 km || multiple || 1999–2020 || 15 Oct 2020 || 54 || align=left | Disc.: SpacewatchAdded on 17 January 2021 || 
|- id="1999 TG75" bgcolor=#d6d6d6
| 0 ||  || MBA-O || 17.14 || 2.1 km || multiple || 1999–2021 || 29 Sep 2021 || 52 || align=left | Disc.: Spacewatch || 
|- id="1999 TO75" bgcolor=#E9E9E9
| 0 ||  || MBA-M || 17.36 || 1.9 km || multiple || 1999–2021 || 11 May 2021 || 115 || align=left | Disc.: SpacewatchAlt.: 2011 GJ12, 2017 PD28 || 
|- id="1999 TZ75" bgcolor=#fefefe
| 1 ||  || MBA-I || 19.50 || data-sort-value="0.37" | 370 m || multiple || 1999–2019 || 02 Nov 2019 || 27 || align=left | Disc.: SpacewatchAdded on 24 December 2021 || 
|- id="1999 TB76" bgcolor=#d6d6d6
| 0 ||  || MBA-O || 15.8 || 4.3 km || multiple || 1999–2020 || 15 Apr 2020 || 69 || align=left | Disc.: SpacewatchAlt.: 2010 LF70 || 
|- id="1999 TB77" bgcolor=#fefefe
| 4 ||  || MBA-I || 19.6 || data-sort-value="0.36" | 360 m || multiple || 1999–2016 || 07 Nov 2016 || 18 || align=left | Disc.: SpacewatchAdded on 21 August 2021 || 
|- id="1999 TS77" bgcolor=#d6d6d6
| 1 ||  || MBA-O || 17.0 || 2.2 km || multiple || 1999–2021 || 06 Feb 2021 || 119 || align=left | Disc.: SpacewatchAdded on 17 January 2021Alt.: 2014 QE11 || 
|- id="1999 TW77" bgcolor=#fefefe
| 0 ||  || MBA-I || 17.73 || data-sort-value="0.85" | 850 m || multiple || 1995–2022 || 05 Jan 2022 || 150 || align=left | Disc.: SpacewatchAlt.: 2008 EY146, 2010 XO34, 2012 LW19 || 
|- id="1999 TB78" bgcolor=#FA8072
| 0 ||  || MCA || 17.87 || data-sort-value="0.79" | 790 m || multiple || 1960–2021 || 06 Apr 2021 || 98 || align=left | Disc.: SpacewatchAlt.: 2009 UT130, 2017 BX63, 4198 P-L || 
|- id="1999 TH78" bgcolor=#fefefe
| 0 ||  || MBA-I || 18.68 || data-sort-value="0.55" | 550 m || multiple || 1999–2021 || 24 Nov 2021 || 101 || align=left | Disc.: SpacewatchAlt.: 2010 RH101 || 
|- id="1999 TM78" bgcolor=#d6d6d6
| 0 ||  || MBA-O || 17.07 || 2.1 km || multiple || 1999–2021 || 02 Dec 2021 || 105 || align=left | Disc.: SpacewatchAdded on 21 August 2021Alt.: 2010 OP135 || 
|- id="1999 TB79" bgcolor=#d6d6d6
| 1 ||  || MBA-O || 17.9 || 1.5 km || multiple || 1999–2020 || 21 Oct 2020 || 81 || align=left | Disc.: SpacewatchAlt.: 2015 TK96 || 
|- id="1999 TL80" bgcolor=#E9E9E9
| 1 ||  || MBA-M || 17.9 || 1.1 km || multiple || 1999–2020 || 05 Nov 2020 || 94 || align=left | Disc.: SpacewatchAlt.: 1999 UE61, 2016 TR85 || 
|- id="1999 TU80" bgcolor=#E9E9E9
| 0 ||  || MBA-M || 18.06 || data-sort-value="0.73" | 730 m || multiple || 1999–2020 || 10 Dec 2020 || 32 || align=left | Disc.: Spacewatch || 
|- id="1999 TU82" bgcolor=#fefefe
| 2 ||  || MBA-I || 18.4 || data-sort-value="0.62" | 620 m || multiple || 1999–2020 || 14 Dec 2020 || 52 || align=left | Disc.: SpacewatchAlt.: 2006 UY94 || 
|- id="1999 TE83" bgcolor=#E9E9E9
| 0 ||  || MBA-M || 17.55 || data-sort-value="0.92" | 920 m || multiple || 1999–2022 || 27 Jan 2022 || 133 || align=left | Disc.: SpacewatchAlt.: 2003 SQ5, 2003 SZ433, 2003 SL462 || 
|- id="1999 TL83" bgcolor=#d6d6d6
| 0 ||  || MBA-O || 16.74 || 2.5 km || multiple || 1999–2021 || 09 Sep 2021 || 73 || align=left | Disc.: Spacewatch || 
|- id="1999 TP83" bgcolor=#d6d6d6
| 0 ||  || MBA-O || 16.55 || 2.7 km || multiple || 1999–2021 || 25 Nov 2021 || 160 || align=left | Disc.: Spacewatch || 
|- id="1999 TV83" bgcolor=#FA8072
| 0 ||  || MCA || 18.1 || 1.0 km || multiple || 1999–2020 || 12 Dec 2020 || 59 || align=left | Disc.: SpacewatchAlt.: 2013 EH41 || 
|- id="1999 TB84" bgcolor=#E9E9E9
| 0 ||  || MBA-M || 16.8 || 1.3 km || multiple || 1999–2021 || 16 Jan 2021 || 125 || align=left | Disc.: Spacewatch || 
|- id="1999 TC84" bgcolor=#E9E9E9
| 0 ||  || MBA-M || 17.50 || 1.8 km || multiple || 1999–2021 || 02 Oct 2021 || 83 || align=left | Disc.: SpacewatchAlt.: 1999 TK307, 2010 CG33 || 
|- id="1999 TE84" bgcolor=#E9E9E9
| 0 ||  || MBA-M || 17.7 || 1.6 km || multiple || 1999–2020 || 27 Feb 2020 || 69 || align=left | Disc.: Spacewatch || 
|- id="1999 TG84" bgcolor=#E9E9E9
| 0 ||  || MBA-M || 17.9 || 1.5 km || multiple || 1999–2020 || 21 Apr 2020 || 40 || align=left | Disc.: SpacewatchAlt.: 2019 AE32 || 
|- id="1999 TU84" bgcolor=#fefefe
| 0 ||  || MBA-I || 18.24 || data-sort-value="0.67" | 670 m || multiple || 1999–2021 || 27 Oct 2021 || 169 || align=left | Disc.: Spacewatch || 
|- id="1999 TV84" bgcolor=#d6d6d6
| 0 ||  || MBA-O || 17.1 || 2.1 km || multiple || 1999–2019 || 19 Dec 2019 || 93 || align=left | Disc.: SpacewatchAlt.: 2017 HN30 || 
|- id="1999 TX84" bgcolor=#E9E9E9
| 0 ||  || MBA-M || 17.87 || 1.1 km || multiple || 1999–2021 || 27 Nov 2021 || 78 || align=left | Disc.: SpacewatchAdded on 24 December 2021 || 
|- id="1999 TO85" bgcolor=#d6d6d6
| 0 ||  || MBA-O || 17.05 || 2.2 km || multiple || 1999–2021 || 02 Oct 2021 || 90 || align=left | Disc.: SpacewatchAlt.: 2005 WM189, 2010 NB39, 2012 BU40 || 
|- id="1999 TR85" bgcolor=#fefefe
| 0 ||  || MBA-I || 18.83 || data-sort-value="0.51" | 510 m || multiple || 1999–2022 || 27 Jan 2022 || 60 || align=left | Disc.: Spacewatch || 
|- id="1999 TJ87" bgcolor=#E9E9E9
| 0 ||  || MBA-M || 17.33 || 1.4 km || multiple || 1999–2021 || 21 Dec 2021 || 119 || align=left | Disc.: SpacewatchAlt.: 2015 HQ134, 2016 PN35 || 
|- id="1999 TK128" bgcolor=#E9E9E9
| 1 ||  || MBA-M || 17.7 || 1.2 km || multiple || 1999–2020 || 20 Oct 2020 || 49 || align=left | Disc.: LINEAR || 
|- id="1999 TQ141" bgcolor=#E9E9E9
| 0 ||  || MBA-M || 17.02 || 1.7 km || multiple || 1999–2022 || 21 Jan 2022 || 130 || align=left | Disc.: LINEARAdded on 21 August 2021Alt.: 2008 WT108 || 
|- id="1999 TN153" bgcolor=#E9E9E9
| 1 ||  || MBA-M || 17.1 || 1.1 km || multiple || 1999–2021 || 10 Jan 2021 || 85 || align=left | Disc.: LINEAR || 
|- id="1999 TC164" bgcolor=#E9E9E9
| 2 ||  || MBA-M || 17.8 || data-sort-value="0.82" | 820 m || multiple || 1999–2020 || 22 Nov 2020 || 39 || align=left | Disc.: LINEARAdded on 21 August 2021 || 
|- id="1999 TW166" bgcolor=#E9E9E9
| 3 ||  || MBA-M || 18.5 || data-sort-value="0.59" | 590 m || multiple || 1999–2019 || 23 Aug 2019 || 42 || align=left | Disc.: LINEAR || 
|- id="1999 TN173" bgcolor=#FA8072
| – ||  || MCA || 19.2 || data-sort-value="0.43" | 430 m || single || 22 days || 31 Oct 1999 || 24 || align=left | Disc.: LINEAR || 
|- id="1999 TV174" bgcolor=#E9E9E9
| 0 ||  || MBA-M || 17.69 || 1.2 km || multiple || 1999–2021 || 27 Nov 2021 || 91 || align=left | Disc.: LINEARAdded on 5 November 2021 || 
|- id="1999 TP175" bgcolor=#fefefe
| 1 ||  || MBA-I || 18.2 || data-sort-value="0.68" | 680 m || multiple || 1999–2019 || 22 Jun 2019 || 52 || align=left | Disc.: LINEARAlt.: 2016 QO7 || 
|- id="1999 TE176" bgcolor=#fefefe
| 0 ||  || MBA-I || 18.78 || data-sort-value="0.52" | 520 m || multiple || 1999–2022 || 25 Jan 2022 || 46 || align=left | Disc.: LINEARAlt.: 2006 RU1, 2013 PT4 || 
|- id="1999 TV194" bgcolor=#d6d6d6
| 0 ||  || MBA-O || 16.6 || 2.7 km || multiple || 1999–2021 || 01 Dec 2021 || 115 || align=left | Disc.: LINEARAlt.: 2010 VD128 || 
|- id="1999 TM195" bgcolor=#E9E9E9
| 0 ||  || MBA-M || 17.37 || 1.4 km || multiple || 1999–2021 || 01 Dec 2021 || 178 || align=left | Disc.: LINEAR || 
|- id="1999 TG205" bgcolor=#fefefe
| 1 ||  || MBA-I || 17.59 || data-sort-value="0.90" | 900 m || multiple || 1999–2021 || 08 May 2021 || 72 || align=left | Disc.: LINEARAlt.: 2003 WP71 || 
|- id="1999 TK212" bgcolor=#E9E9E9
| 2 ||  || MBA-M || 17.5 || 1.8 km || multiple || 1999–2017 || 24 Nov 2017 || 142 || align=left | Disc.: LINEARAlt.: 2008 UC200 || 
|- id="1999 TM216" bgcolor=#FA8072
| 0 ||  || MCA || 18.92 || data-sort-value="0.49" | 490 m || multiple || 1999–2021 || 27 Nov 2021 || 87 || align=left | Disc.: LINEARAlt.: 2010 QF1 || 
|- id="1999 TU218" bgcolor=#E9E9E9
| 1 ||  || MBA-M || 17.6 || 1.7 km || multiple || 1999–2020 || 19 Apr 2020 || 61 || align=left | Disc.: LINEAR || 
|- id="1999 TL225" bgcolor=#E9E9E9
| 0 ||  || MBA-M || 17.2 || 1.1 km || multiple || 1999–2021 || 18 Jan 2021 || 216 || align=left | Disc.: Spacewatch || 
|- id="1999 TR226" bgcolor=#E9E9E9
| 1 ||  || MBA-M || 18.2 || data-sort-value="0.96" | 960 m || multiple || 1999–2016 || 02 Oct 2016 || 48 || align=left | Disc.: SpacewatchAlt.: 2012 VK104 || 
|- id="1999 TM227" bgcolor=#E9E9E9
| 0 ||  || MBA-M || 16.81 || 2.4 km || multiple || 1999–2021 || 13 Jun 2021 || 154 || align=left | Disc.: SpacewatchAlt.: 2018 VM71 || 
|- id="1999 TN227" bgcolor=#fefefe
| 0 ||  || MBA-I || 18.58 || data-sort-value="0.57" | 570 m || multiple || 1999–2021 || 06 Nov 2021 || 69 || align=left | Disc.: Spacewatch || 
|- id="1999 TF231" bgcolor=#fefefe
| 0 ||  || MBA-I || 17.91 || data-sort-value="0.78" | 780 m || multiple || 1999–2021 || 08 May 2021 || 78 || align=left | Disc.: CSS || 
|- id="1999 TR233" bgcolor=#E9E9E9
| 0 ||  || MBA-M || 17.7 || data-sort-value="0.86" | 860 m || multiple || 1999–2019 || 03 Sep 2019 || 91 || align=left | Disc.: SpacewatchAlt.: 2014 DA140 || 
|- id="1999 TB238" bgcolor=#E9E9E9
| 1 ||  || MBA-M || 17.3 || 1.5 km || multiple || 1999–2016 || 14 Nov 2016 || 54 || align=left | Disc.: CSSAlt.: 2012 TA140, 2016 SB3 || 
|- id="1999 TG239" bgcolor=#fefefe
| 0 ||  || MBA-I || 17.9 || data-sort-value="0.78" | 780 m || multiple || 1999-2021 || 08 May 2021 || 45 || align=left | Disc.: Spacewatch Alt.: 2007 VK151 = 2016 AC37  || 
|- id="1999 TH239" bgcolor=#d6d6d6
| 0 ||  || MBA-O || 17.3 || 1.9 km || multiple || 1999–2019 || 19 Sep 2019 || 34 || align=left | Disc.: CSSAdded on 17 January 2021Alt.: 2016 CZ356 || 
|- id="1999 TL243" bgcolor=#E9E9E9
| 0 ||  || MBA-M || 18.11 || data-sort-value="0.71" | 710 m || multiple || 1999–2020 || 08 Dec 2020 || 61 || align=left | Disc.: LINEARAdded on 9 March 2021Alt.: 2019 MC17 || 
|- id="1999 TX250" bgcolor=#E9E9E9
| 0 ||  || MBA-M || 17.5 || data-sort-value="0.94" | 940 m || multiple || 1999–2020 || 16 Nov 2020 || 54 || align=left | Disc.: Spacewatch || 
|- id="1999 TX254" bgcolor=#E9E9E9
| 0 ||  || MBA-M || 17.88 || 1.5 km || multiple || 1999–2021 || 30 May 2021 || 34 || align=left | Disc.: LINEAR || 
|- id="1999 TJ255" bgcolor=#E9E9E9
| 3 ||  || MBA-M || 18.9 || data-sort-value="0.49" | 490 m || multiple || 1999–2003 || 24 Oct 2003 || 14 || align=left | Disc.: Spacewatch || 
|- id="1999 TO255" bgcolor=#E9E9E9
| 0 ||  || MBA-M || 17.2 || 2.0 km || multiple || 1999–2020 || 22 Mar 2020 || 97 || align=left | Disc.: SpacewatchAlt.: 2011 FF74 || 
|- id="1999 TY262" bgcolor=#E9E9E9
| 1 ||  || MBA-M || 17.6 || data-sort-value="0.90" | 900 m || multiple || 1999–2021 || 14 Jan 2021 || 91 || align=left | Disc.: Spacewatch || 
|- id="1999 TB263" bgcolor=#d6d6d6
| 0 ||  || MBA-O || 17.4 || 1.8 km || multiple || 1999–2018 || 08 Aug 2018 || 44 || align=left | Disc.: SpacewatchAlt.: 2014 WK446 || 
|- id="1999 TD263" bgcolor=#E9E9E9
| 0 ||  || MBA-M || 17.3 || 1.0 km || multiple || 1999–2021 || 11 Jan 2021 || 75 || align=left | Disc.: Spacewatch || 
|- id="1999 TU263" bgcolor=#fefefe
| 0 ||  || MBA-I || 18.4 || data-sort-value="0.62" | 620 m || multiple || 1999–2017 || 13 Nov 2017 || 60 || align=left | Disc.: SpacewatchAlt.: 2013 PT57 || 
|- id="1999 TV263" bgcolor=#E9E9E9
| 0 ||  || MBA-M || 17.43 || 1.4 km || multiple || 1999–2021 || 24 Nov 2021 || 158 || align=left | Disc.: SpacewatchAlt.: 2015 FD177, 2016 NH54, 2017 WD7 || 
|- id="1999 TD276" bgcolor=#E9E9E9
| 1 ||  || MBA-M || 18.16 || data-sort-value="0.69" | 690 m || multiple || 1999–2020 || 17 Dec 2020 || 52 || align=left | Disc.: LINEARAdded on 17 January 2021 || 
|- id="1999 TS276" bgcolor=#E9E9E9
| 0 ||  || MBA-M || 16.98 || 2.2 km || multiple || 1999–2021 || 30 Oct 2021 || 174 || align=left | Disc.: LINEARAlt.: 2008 VY49, 2015 FZ262 || 
|- id="1999 TD277" bgcolor=#fefefe
| 0 ||  || MBA-I || 18.1 || data-sort-value="0.71" | 710 m || multiple || 1999–2018 || 10 Aug 2018 || 49 || align=left | Disc.: LINEARAdded on 21 August 2021 || 
|- id="1999 TE277" bgcolor=#d6d6d6
| 0 ||  || MBA-O || 17.45 || 1.8 km || multiple || 1999–2021 || 29 Oct 2021 || 59 || align=left | Disc.: LINEARAdded on 30 September 2021Alt.: 2010 ST61 || 
|- id="1999 TG277" bgcolor=#d6d6d6
| 0 ||  || MBA-O || 17.36 || 1.9 km || multiple || 1999–2021 || 29 Oct 2021 || 66 || align=left | Disc.: LINEARAdded on 5 November 2021Alt.: 2010 TB42, 2021 RK91 || 
|- id="1999 TU281" bgcolor=#d6d6d6
| 0 ||  || MBA-O || 16.7 || 2.5 km || multiple || 1999–2018 || 12 Jan 2018 || 30 || align=left | Disc.: LINEAR || 
|- id="1999 TV293" bgcolor=#fefefe
| 4 ||  || MBA-I || 19.2 || data-sort-value="0.43" | 430 m || multiple || 1999–2016 || 19 Nov 2016 || 22 || align=left | Disc.: SpacewatchAdded on 22 July 2020Alt.: 2016 TG85 || 
|- id="1999 TW293" bgcolor=#fefefe
| 1 ||  || MBA-I || 18.5 || data-sort-value="0.59" | 590 m || multiple || 1999–2017 || 13 Nov 2017 || 42 || align=left | Disc.: SpacewatchAdded on 22 July 2020 || 
|- id="1999 TP297" bgcolor=#E9E9E9
| 0 ||  || MBA-M || 17.23 || 2.0 km || multiple || 1999–2021 || 16 Apr 2021 || 78 || align=left | Disc.: SpacewatchAlt.: 1999 VG227 || 
|- id="1999 TR298" bgcolor=#d6d6d6
| 0 ||  || MBA-O || 16.9 || 2.3 km || multiple || 1999–2020 || 22 Apr 2020 || 57 || align=left | Disc.: SpacewatchAlt.: 2005 SW248, 2010 JV182 || 
|- id="1999 TN299" bgcolor=#E9E9E9
| 1 ||  || MBA-M || 17.65 || 1.6 km || multiple || 1999–2021 || 17 Jul 2021 || 58 || align=left | Disc.: SpacewatchAlt.: 2008 TD74 || 
|- id="1999 TO299" bgcolor=#fefefe
| 0 ||  || MBA-I || 18.72 || data-sort-value="0.54" | 540 m || multiple || 1999–2022 || 07 Jan 2022 || 49 || align=left | Disc.: Spacewatch || 
|- id="1999 TH300" bgcolor=#E9E9E9
| 2 ||  || MBA-M || 18.3 || data-sort-value="0.92" | 920 m || multiple || 1999–2016 || 09 Jul 2016 || 21 || align=left | Disc.: Spacewatch || 
|- id="1999 TJ300" bgcolor=#E9E9E9
| – ||  || MBA-M || 18.5 || data-sort-value="0.59" | 590 m || single || 10 days || 13 Oct 1999 || 8 || align=left | Disc.: Spacewatch || 
|- id="1999 TE301" bgcolor=#E9E9E9
| 1 ||  || MBA-M || 18.1 || data-sort-value="0.71" | 710 m || multiple || 1999–2020 || 09 Dec 2020 || 79 || align=left | Disc.: SpacewatchAdded on 17 January 2021 || 
|- id="1999 TN301" bgcolor=#fefefe
| 3 ||  || MBA-I || 19.1 || data-sort-value="0.45" | 450 m || multiple || 1999–2017 || 13 Nov 2017 || 33 || align=left | Disc.: Spacewatch || 
|- id="1999 TX301" bgcolor=#E9E9E9
| 0 ||  || MBA-M || 17.24 || 1.5 km || multiple || 1999–2021 || 06 Nov 2021 || 119 || align=left | Disc.: SpacewatchAlt.: 2008 VV35, 2015 FM138 || 
|- id="1999 TH302" bgcolor=#d6d6d6
| 0 ||  || MBA-O || 16.64 || 2.6 km || multiple || 1999–2019 || 08 May 2019 || 76 || align=left | Disc.: Spacewatch || 
|- id="1999 TM302" bgcolor=#fefefe
| 0 ||  || MBA-I || 18.75 || data-sort-value="0.53" | 530 m || multiple || 1999–2021 || 30 Nov 2021 || 69 || align=left | Disc.: Spacewatch || 
|- id="1999 TP302" bgcolor=#fefefe
| 0 ||  || MBA-I || 19.08 || data-sort-value="0.45" | 450 m || multiple || 1999–2017 || 28 Sep 2017 || 43 || align=left | Disc.: SpacewatchAlt.: 2005 EK303 || 
|- id="1999 TR302" bgcolor=#E9E9E9
| 0 ||  || MBA-M || 16.99 || 2.2 km || multiple || 1999–2021 || 13 Jul 2021 || 152 || align=left | Disc.: SpacewatchAlt.: 2004 TS271, 2006 DQ79, 2009 WZ250 || 
|- id="1999 TZ302" bgcolor=#E9E9E9
| 0 ||  || MBA-M || 17.9 || data-sort-value="0.78" | 780 m || multiple || 1999–2021 || 12 Jan 2021 || 86 || align=left | Disc.: Spacewatch || 
|- id="1999 TC303" bgcolor=#E9E9E9
| 0 ||  || MBA-M || 17.55 || 1.3 km || multiple || 1999–2021 || 27 Oct 2021 || 101 || align=left | Disc.: Spacewatch || 
|- id="1999 TD303" bgcolor=#E9E9E9
| 3 ||  || MBA-M || 18.4 || data-sort-value="0.62" | 620 m || multiple || 1999–2019 || 31 May 2019 || 32 || align=left | Disc.: Spacewatch || 
|- id="1999 TJ303" bgcolor=#fefefe
| 4 ||  || MBA-I || 19.1 || data-sort-value="0.45" | 450 m || multiple || 1999–2017 || 26 Nov 2017 || 29 || align=left | Disc.: Spacewatch || 
|- id="1999 TN303" bgcolor=#d6d6d6
| 0 ||  || MBA-O || 17.0 || 2.2 km || multiple || 1999–2020 || 15 Oct 2020 || 89 || align=left | Disc.: SpacewatchAdded on 22 July 2020Alt.: 2004 RJ134, 2013 FS15 || 
|- id="1999 TT303" bgcolor=#d6d6d6
| 0 ||  || MBA-O || 17.44 || 1.8 km || multiple || 1999–2021 || 09 Dec 2021 || 59 || align=left | Disc.: SpacewatchAdded on 24 December 2021 || 
|- id="1999 TA304" bgcolor=#d6d6d6
| 0 ||  || MBA-O || 17.19 || 2.0 km || multiple || 1999–2021 || 02 Dec 2021 || 63 || align=left | Disc.: SpacewatchAdded on 22 July 2020 || 
|- id="1999 TH304" bgcolor=#E9E9E9
| 0 ||  || MBA-M || 18.18 || data-sort-value="0.97" | 970 m || multiple || 1999–2021 || 26 Nov 2021 || 59 || align=left | Disc.: Spacewatch || 
|- id="1999 TJ304" bgcolor=#E9E9E9
| 0 ||  || MBA-M || 16.9 || 2.3 km || multiple || 1999–2021 || 03 Dec 2021 || 114 || align=left | Disc.: Spacewatch || 
|- id="1999 TE305" bgcolor=#E9E9E9
| 0 ||  || MBA-M || 17.0 || 2.2 km || multiple || 1994–2020 || 19 Apr 2020 || 113 || align=left | Disc.: Spacewatch || 
|- id="1999 TG305" bgcolor=#d6d6d6
| 0 ||  || MBA-O || 16.78 || 2.5 km || multiple || 1999–2021 || 30 Nov 2021 || 168 || align=left | Disc.: SpacewatchAlt.: 2007 GC82 || 
|- id="1999 TW305" bgcolor=#E9E9E9
| 1 ||  || MBA-M || 17.1 || 2.1 km || multiple || 1999–2020 || 27 Feb 2020 || 46 || align=left | Disc.: Spacewatch || 
|- id="1999 TX305" bgcolor=#E9E9E9
| – ||  || MBA-M || 18.7 || data-sort-value="0.54" | 540 m || single || 15 days || 19 Oct 1999 || 9 || align=left | Disc.: Spacewatch || 
|- id="1999 TY305" bgcolor=#E9E9E9
| 0 ||  || MBA-M || 17.2 || 1.1 km || multiple || 1999–2020 || 05 Nov 2020 || 107 || align=left | Disc.: Spacewatch || 
|- id="1999 TS306" bgcolor=#d6d6d6
| 0 ||  || MBA-O || 17.03 || 2.2 km || multiple || 1999–2021 || 01 Nov 2021 || 47 || align=left | Disc.: Spacewatch || 
|- id="1999 TF307" bgcolor=#E9E9E9
| 1 ||  || MBA-M || 17.9 || data-sort-value="0.78" | 780 m || multiple || 1999–2019 || 22 Sep 2019 || 60 || align=left | Disc.: SpacewatchAdded on 5 November 2021Alt.: 2010 LS140 || 
|- id="1999 TW307" bgcolor=#fefefe
| 0 ||  || MBA-I || 18.8 || data-sort-value="0.52" | 520 m || multiple || 1999–2020 || 22 Jun 2020 || 36 || align=left | Disc.: SpacewatchAlt.: 2016 BB23 || 
|- id="1999 TX307" bgcolor=#d6d6d6
| 0 ||  || MBA-O || 16.66 || 2.5 km || multiple || 1999–2022 || 07 Jan 2022 || 148 || align=left | Disc.: SpacewatchAlt.: 2010 OP14 || 
|- id="1999 TZ307" bgcolor=#E9E9E9
| 0 ||  || MBA-M || 17.26 || 2.0 km || multiple || 1999–2021 || 14 Jun 2021 || 76 || align=left | Disc.: Spacewatch || 
|- id="1999 TF308" bgcolor=#d6d6d6
| 0 ||  || MBA-O || 17.28 || 1.9 km || multiple || 1999–2021 || 14 Apr 2021 || 85 || align=left | Disc.: Spacewatch || 
|- id="1999 TP308" bgcolor=#fefefe
| 1 ||  || MBA-I || 18.4 || data-sort-value="0.62" | 620 m || multiple || 1999–2018 || 15 Oct 2018 || 48 || align=left | Disc.: SpacewatchAdded on 19 October 2020 || 
|- id="1999 TT308" bgcolor=#fefefe
| 0 ||  || MBA-I || 18.52 || data-sort-value="0.59" | 590 m || multiple || 1999–2021 || 29 Nov 2021 || 74 || align=left | Disc.: Spacewatch || 
|- id="1999 TB309" bgcolor=#d6d6d6
| 0 ||  || MBA-O || 16.53 || 2.8 km || multiple || 1999–2021 || 27 Oct 2021 || 123 || align=left | Disc.: LINEARAlt.: 2010 VE210 || 
|- id="1999 TF309" bgcolor=#d6d6d6
| 0 ||  || MBA-O || 17.3 || 1.9 km || multiple || 1999–2020 || 30 Jan 2020 || 105 || align=left | Disc.: SpacewatchAlt.: 2014 WP163 || 
|- id="1999 TL309" bgcolor=#d6d6d6
| 0 ||  || MBA-O || 17.5 || 1.8 km || multiple || 1999–2020 || 08 Nov 2020 || 66 || align=left | Disc.: SpacewatchAlt.: 2015 RR208 || 
|- id="1999 TV309" bgcolor=#E9E9E9
| 2 ||  || MBA-M || 18.3 || 1.2 km || multiple || 1999–2017 || 28 Sep 2017 || 29 || align=left | Disc.: Spacewatch || 
|- id="1999 TW309" bgcolor=#fefefe
| D ||  || MBA-I || 18.9 || data-sort-value="0.49" | 490 m || single || 11 days || 14 Oct 1999 || 11 || align=left | Disc.: SpacewatchAlt.: 1999 TT334 || 
|- id="1999 TX309" bgcolor=#fefefe
| 0 ||  || MBA-I || 18.42 || data-sort-value="0.62" | 620 m || multiple || 1999–2021 || 09 Nov 2021 || 106 || align=left | Disc.: Spacewatch || 
|- id="1999 TU310" bgcolor=#d6d6d6
| 0 ||  || MBA-O || 17.54 || 1.7 km || multiple || 1999–2021 || 07 Feb 2021 || 47 || align=left | Disc.: SpacewatchAdded on 21 August 2021 || 
|- id="1999 TD312" bgcolor=#fefefe
| 1 ||  || MBA-I || 18.8 || data-sort-value="0.52" | 520 m || multiple || 1999–2019 || 25 Oct 2019 || 75 || align=left | Disc.: SpacewatchAlt.: 2019 NZ13 || 
|- id="1999 TN312" bgcolor=#fefefe
| 2 ||  || MBA-I || 19.1 || data-sort-value="0.45" | 450 m || multiple || 1999–2020 || 14 Nov 2020 || 66 || align=left | Disc.: SpacewatchAdded on 30 September 2021Alt.: 2006 SR292 || 
|- id="1999 TS312" bgcolor=#E9E9E9
| 0 ||  || MBA-M || 17.91 || 1.5 km || multiple || 1999–2021 || 27 Jun 2021 || 106 || align=left | Disc.: SpacewatchAlt.: 2008 RF137 || 
|- id="1999 TT312" bgcolor=#fefefe
| 1 ||  || MBA-I || 18.7 || data-sort-value="0.54" | 540 m || multiple || 1999–2020 || 24 Mar 2020 || 23 || align=left | Disc.: SpacewatchAlt.: 2012 UE166 || 
|- id="1999 TA314" bgcolor=#fefefe
| 0 ||  || MBA-I || 19.04 || data-sort-value="0.46" | 460 m || multiple || 1999–2021 || 14 Aug 2021 || 70 || align=left | Disc.: Spacewatch || 
|- id="1999 TG314" bgcolor=#fefefe
| 0 ||  || MBA-I || 17.9 || data-sort-value="0.78" | 780 m || multiple || 1992–2020 || 06 Dec 2020 || 150 || align=left | Disc.: SpacewatchAlt.: 1992 SZ10, 2016 JM21 || 
|- id="1999 TO314" bgcolor=#E9E9E9
| 0 ||  || MBA-M || 17.28 || 1.9 km || multiple || 1999–2021 || 31 Oct 2021 || 92 || align=left | Disc.: Spacewatch || 
|- id="1999 TU314" bgcolor=#fefefe
| 2 ||  || HUN || 19.3 || data-sort-value="0.41" | 410 m || multiple || 1999–2017 || 10 Nov 2017 || 23 || align=left | Disc.: SpacewatchAlt.: 2016 GN153 || 
|- id="1999 TZ315" bgcolor=#fefefe
| 0 ||  || MBA-I || 18.73 || data-sort-value="0.53" | 530 m || multiple || 1999–2021 || 27 Oct 2021 || 116 || align=left | Disc.: SpacewatchAlt.: 2010 SQ35 || 
|- id="1999 TR316" bgcolor=#E9E9E9
| 0 ||  || MBA-M || 17.51 || 1.8 km || multiple || 1999–2021 || 01 Jul 2021 || 116 || align=left | Disc.: SpacewatchAlt.: 2008 SK19, 2016 FE33 || 
|- id="1999 TW316" bgcolor=#E9E9E9
| 0 ||  || MBA-M || 17.2 || 1.1 km || multiple || 1999–2021 || 09 Jan 2021 || 201 || align=left | Disc.: Spacewatch || 
|- id="1999 TB317" bgcolor=#E9E9E9
| 0 ||  || MBA-M || 17.38 || 1.4 km || multiple || 1999–2021 || 26 Nov 2021 || 130 || align=left | Disc.: Spacewatch || 
|- id="1999 TJ317" bgcolor=#fefefe
| 0 ||  || MBA-I || 18.4 || data-sort-value="0.62" | 620 m || multiple || 1999–2021 || 12 Feb 2021 || 86 || align=left | Disc.: SpacewatchAdded on 24 December 2021 || 
|- id="1999 TE318" bgcolor=#E9E9E9
| 0 ||  || MBA-M || 17.4 || 1.8 km || multiple || 1999–2021 || 08 Jun 2021 || 65 || align=left | Disc.: Spacewatch || 
|- id="1999 TF318" bgcolor=#d6d6d6
| 1 ||  || MBA-O || 17.2 || 2.0 km || multiple || 1999–2020 || 12 Dec 2020 || 71 || align=left | Disc.: SpacewatchAlt.: 2014 SS376 || 
|- id="1999 TJ321" bgcolor=#E9E9E9
| 0 ||  || MBA-M || 18.18 || data-sort-value="0.97" | 970 m || multiple || 1999–2022 || 26 Jan 2022 || 67 || align=left | Disc.: SpacewatchAlt.: 1999 VK117 || 
|- id="1999 TK321" bgcolor=#E9E9E9
| 0 ||  || MBA-M || 17.3 || 1.0 km || multiple || 1999–2021 || 07 Jan 2021 || 63 || align=left | Disc.: Spacewatch || 
|- id="1999 TV321" bgcolor=#E9E9E9
| 0 ||  || MBA-M || 17.5 || data-sort-value="0.94" | 940 m || multiple || 1999–2019 || 23 Aug 2019 || 71 || align=left | Disc.: SpacewatchAlt.: 2014 HG45 || 
|- id="1999 TC322" bgcolor=#FA8072
| 2 ||  || MCA || 19.1 || data-sort-value="0.45" | 450 m || multiple || 1999–2020 || 22 Jun 2020 || 22 || align=left | Disc.: CSS || 
|- id="1999 TJ325" bgcolor=#E9E9E9
| 0 ||  || MBA-M || 16.89 || 2.3 km || multiple || 1999–2021 || 03 May 2021 || 72 || align=left | Disc.: LINEAR || 
|- id="1999 TC326" bgcolor=#d6d6d6
| 0 ||  || MBA-O || 17.1 || 2.1 km || multiple || 1999–2021 || 10 Oct 2021 || 109 || align=left | Disc.: SpacewatchAdded on 22 July 2020Alt.: 2010 LF123 || 
|- id="1999 TR327" bgcolor=#fefefe
| 2 ||  || MBA-I || 18.8 || data-sort-value="0.52" | 520 m || multiple || 1999–2020 || 20 May 2020 || 68 || align=left | Disc.: Spacewatch || 
|- id="1999 TA328" bgcolor=#E9E9E9
| 0 ||  || MBA-M || 17.94 || 1.1 km || multiple || 1999–2021 || 09 Jan 2021 || 183 || align=left | Disc.: CSS || 
|- id="1999 TJ328" bgcolor=#E9E9E9
| 0 ||  || MBA-M || 17.36 || 1.9 km || multiple || 1999–2021 || 01 Nov 2021 || 123 || align=left | Disc.: SDSSAlt.: 2015 FH367 || 
|- id="1999 TS328" bgcolor=#d6d6d6
| 0 ||  || MBA-O || 16.9 || 2.3 km || multiple || 1999–2018 || 03 Oct 2018 || 82 || align=left | Disc.: SpacewatchAlt.: 2006 CM36, 2009 WO38 || 
|- id="1999 TV328" bgcolor=#E9E9E9
| 0 ||  || MBA-M || 17.4 || 1.4 km || multiple || 1999–2021 || 16 Jun 2021 || 49 || align=left | Disc.: SDSSAlt.: 2004 VY79 || 
|- id="1999 TX328" bgcolor=#d6d6d6
| 0 ||  || MBA-O || 16.11 || 3.3 km || multiple || 1999–2021 || 10 Oct 2021 || 160 || align=left | Disc.: SDSSAlt.: 2016 TK9, 2016 TY30 || 
|- id="1999 TA329" bgcolor=#E9E9E9
| 0 ||  || MBA-M || 17.8 || data-sort-value="0.82" | 820 m || multiple || 1999–2021 || 17 Jan 2021 || 36 || align=left | Disc.: SDSSAdded on 22 July 2020 || 
|- id="1999 TC329" bgcolor=#d6d6d6
| 0 ||  = (619182) || MBA-O || 16.74 || 2.5 km || multiple || 1999–2021 || 24 Nov 2021 || 110 || align=left | Disc.: SDSSAlt.: 2010 OA86, 2010 OX145 || 
|- id="1999 TF329" bgcolor=#E9E9E9
| 0 ||  || MBA-M || 17.66 || 1.2 km || multiple || 1999–2021 || 30 Nov 2021 || 119 || align=left | Disc.: SDSS || 
|- id="1999 TL329" bgcolor=#d6d6d6
| 1 ||  || MBA-O || 17.88 || 1.5 km || multiple || 1999–2021 || 08 Nov 2021 || 30 || align=left | Disc.: SDSSAdded on 5 November 2021Alt.: 2010 NL137, 2021 RY102 || 
|- id="1999 TV329" bgcolor=#E9E9E9
| 0 ||  || MBA-M || 17.99 || 1.1 km || multiple || 1999–2022 || 07 Jan 2022 || 90 || align=left | Disc.: SDSS || 
|- id="1999 TE330" bgcolor=#d6d6d6
| 0 ||  || MBA-O || 16.19 || 3.2 km || multiple || 1999–2021 || 29 Oct 2021 || 186 || align=left | Disc.: SDSSAlt.: 2010 LO156, 2011 WN85 || 
|- id="1999 TF330" bgcolor=#E9E9E9
| 0 ||  || MBA-M || 17.02 || 2.2 km || multiple || 1999–2021 || 07 Nov 2021 || 165 || align=left | Disc.: SDSS || 
|- id="1999 TG330" bgcolor=#fefefe
| 0 ||  || MBA-I || 18.22 || data-sort-value="0.67" | 670 m || multiple || 1999–2021 || 26 Sep 2021 || 94 || align=left | Disc.: SDSS || 
|- id="1999 TK330" bgcolor=#E9E9E9
| 3 ||  || MBA-M || 18.7 || 1.0 km || multiple || 1999–2017 || 24 Sep 2017 || 26 || align=left | Disc.: SDSSAdded on 21 August 2021 || 
|- id="1999 TQ330" bgcolor=#fefefe
| 0 ||  || MBA-I || 18.80 || data-sort-value="0.52" | 520 m || multiple || 1999–2022 || 07 Jan 2022 || 52 || align=left | Disc.: SDSSAlt.: 2015 BN291 || 
|- id="1999 TR330" bgcolor=#FA8072
| 0 ||  || MCA || 18.4 || data-sort-value="0.62" | 620 m || multiple || 1999–2020 || 28 Apr 2020 || 48 || align=left | Disc.: SDSS || 
|- id="1999 TT330" bgcolor=#E9E9E9
| 0 ||  || MBA-M || 17.7 || 1.6 km || multiple || 1999–2020 || 16 Mar 2020 || 35 || align=left | Disc.: SDSSAdded on 21 August 2021Alt.: 2011 FR116 || 
|- id="1999 TW330" bgcolor=#d6d6d6
| 0 ||  || MBA-O || 17.10 || 2.1 km || multiple || 1999–2021 || 25 Nov 2021 || 62 || align=left | Disc.: SDSSAdded on 5 November 2021 || 
|- id="1999 TZ330" bgcolor=#fefefe
| 0 ||  || MBA-I || 18.8 || data-sort-value="0.52" | 520 m || multiple || 1999–2020 || 11 Nov 2020 || 45 || align=left | Disc.: SDSS || 
|- id="1999 TC331" bgcolor=#fefefe
| 2 ||  || MBA-I || 19.95 || data-sort-value="0.30" | 300 m || multiple || 1999–2019 || 28 Aug 2019 || 19 || align=left | Disc.: SDSSAdded on 21 August 2021Alt.: 2019 NZ66 || 
|- id="1999 TE331" bgcolor=#E9E9E9
| 0 ||  || MBA-M || 17.30 || 1.9 km || multiple || 1999–2021 || 04 Oct 2021 || 110 || align=left | Disc.: SDSSAdded on 22 July 2020Alt.: 2015 FV208, 2020 HV24 || 
|- id="1999 TG331" bgcolor=#E9E9E9
| 0 ||  || MBA-M || 17.50 || data-sort-value="0.94" | 940 m || multiple || 1999–2022 || 25 Jan 2022 || 106 || align=left | Disc.: SDSS || 
|- id="1999 TP331" bgcolor=#d6d6d6
| 1 ||  || MBA-O || 17.7 || 1.6 km || multiple || 1999–2019 || 25 Jul 2019 || 38 || align=left | Disc.: SDSS || 
|- id="1999 TQ331" bgcolor=#d6d6d6
| 0 ||  || MBA-O || 17.90 || 1.5 km || multiple || 1999–2022 || 23 Jan 2022 || 48 || align=left | Disc.: SDSSAdded on 17 January 2021Alt.: 2015 VK192 || 
|- id="1999 TT331" bgcolor=#fefefe
| 0 ||  || MBA-I || 18.5 || data-sort-value="0.59" | 590 m || multiple || 1999–2020 || 08 Oct 2020 || 68 || align=left | Disc.: SDSSAlt.: 2013 RL59 || 
|- id="1999 TY331" bgcolor=#E9E9E9
| 0 ||  || MBA-M || 17.36 || 1.9 km || multiple || 1999–2021 || 29 Sep 2021 || 91 || align=left | Disc.: SDSSAdded on 22 July 2020 || 
|- id="1999 TJ332" bgcolor=#E9E9E9
| 0 ||  || MBA-M || 17.6 || data-sort-value="0.90" | 900 m || multiple || 1999–2021 || 05 Jan 2021 || 62 || align=left | Disc.: SDSSAdded on 17 January 2021 || 
|- id="1999 TX332" bgcolor=#fefefe
| 1 ||  || MBA-I || 20.02 || data-sort-value="0.29" | 290 m || multiple || 1999–2021 || 15 Nov 2021 || 30 || align=left | Disc.: SDSSAdded on 29 January 2022 || 
|- id="1999 TD333" bgcolor=#E9E9E9
| 0 ||  || MBA-M || 18.3 || data-sort-value="0.65" | 650 m || multiple || 1999–2020 || 17 Dec 2020 || 24 || align=left | Disc.: SDSS || 
|- id="1999 TH333" bgcolor=#E9E9E9
| 0 ||  || MBA-M || 17.36 || 1.9 km || multiple || 1997–2021 || 17 Jun 2021 || 75 || align=left | Disc.: SDSSAlt.: 2015 FT49 || 
|- id="1999 TM333" bgcolor=#d6d6d6
| 0 ||  || MBA-O || 16.61 || 2.7 km || multiple || 1999–2021 || 01 Oct 2021 || 99 || align=left | Disc.: SDSS || 
|- id="1999 TA334" bgcolor=#d6d6d6
| 0 ||  || MBA-O || 16.7 || 2.9 km || multiple || 1999–2021 || 23 Oct 2021 || 108 || align=left | Disc.: SDSSAlt.: 2010 NE47 || 
|- id="1999 TH336" bgcolor=#d6d6d6
| 0 ||  || MBA-O || 17.7 || 1.6 km || multiple || 1999–2020 || 13 Sep 2020 || 80 || align=left | Disc.: SDSSAlt.: 2010 WY48 || 
|- id="1999 TJ336" bgcolor=#d6d6d6
| 0 ||  || MBA-O || 17.16 || 2.1 km || multiple || 1999–2021 || 13 Jul 2021 || 59 || align=left | Disc.: SpacewatchAlt.: 2005 UY191 || 
|- id="1999 TM336" bgcolor=#E9E9E9
| 1 ||  || MBA-M || 18.4 || data-sort-value="0.88" | 880 m || multiple || 1999–2020 || 17 Oct 2020 || 66 || align=left | Disc.: Spacewatch || 
|- id="1999 TO336" bgcolor=#fefefe
| 1 ||  || MBA-I || 19.6 || data-sort-value="0.36" | 360 m || multiple || 1999–2020 || 14 Sep 2020 || 142 || align=left | Disc.: SpacewatchAlt.: 2006 SN232 || 
|- id="1999 TR336" bgcolor=#d6d6d6
| 0 ||  || MBA-O || 16.93 || 2.3 km || multiple || 1999–2021 || 09 Nov 2021 || 57 || align=left | Disc.: SDSS || 
|- id="1999 TS336" bgcolor=#E9E9E9
| 0 ||  || MBA-M || 16.99 || 1.7 km || multiple || 1999–2021 || 09 Nov 2021 || 148 || align=left | Disc.: SDSS || 
|- id="1999 TT336" bgcolor=#fefefe
| 1 ||  || MBA-I || 18.8 || data-sort-value="0.52" | 520 m || multiple || 1999–2017 || 19 Oct 2017 || 20 || align=left | Disc.: SDSS || 
|- id="1999 TX336" bgcolor=#E9E9E9
| 0 ||  || MBA-M || 18.02 || 1.0 km || multiple || 1999–2021 || 02 Oct 2021 || 87 || align=left | Disc.: SpacewatchAlt.: 2017 VY22 || 
|- id="1999 TH337" bgcolor=#E9E9E9
| 0 ||  || MBA-M || 17.08 || 1.6 km || multiple || 1999–2021 || 28 Nov 2021 || 163 || align=left | Disc.: SDSS || 
|- id="1999 TJ337" bgcolor=#fefefe
| 0 ||  || MBA-I || 17.98 || data-sort-value="0.75" | 750 m || multiple || 1999–2021 || 04 Oct 2021 || 103 || align=left | Disc.: Spacewatch || 
|- id="1999 TK337" bgcolor=#E9E9E9
| 0 ||  || MBA-M || 16.89 || 2.3 km || multiple || 1999–2021 || 30 Oct 2021 || 224 || align=left | Disc.: SDSS || 
|- id="1999 TL337" bgcolor=#E9E9E9
| 0 ||  || MBA-M || 16.83 || 1.8 km || multiple || 1999–2021 || 09 Nov 2021 || 124 || align=left | Disc.: SDSS || 
|- id="1999 TM337" bgcolor=#d6d6d6
| 0 ||  || MBA-O || 16.45 || 2.9 km || multiple || 1999–2021 || 05 Oct 2021 || 116 || align=left | Disc.: Spacewatch || 
|- id="1999 TN337" bgcolor=#d6d6d6
| 0 ||  || MBA-O || 16.67 || 2.6 km || multiple || 1999–2021 || 30 Oct 2021 || 127 || align=left | Disc.: SDSSAlt.: 2014 JP34 || 
|- id="1999 TO337" bgcolor=#d6d6d6
| 0 ||  || MBA-O || 16.2 || 3.2 km || multiple || 1999–2020 || 14 Jun 2020 || 95 || align=left | Disc.: Spacewatch || 
|- id="1999 TP337" bgcolor=#E9E9E9
| 0 ||  || MBA-M || 17.11 || 1.6 km || multiple || 1999–2021 || 27 Oct 2021 || 187 || align=left | Disc.: SDSS || 
|- id="1999 TQ337" bgcolor=#fefefe
| 0 ||  || MBA-I || 18.26 || data-sort-value="0.66" | 660 m || multiple || 1999–2022 || 24 Jan 2022 || 103 || align=left | Disc.: Spacewatch || 
|- id="1999 TR337" bgcolor=#d6d6d6
| 0 ||  || MBA-O || 16.30 || 3.1 km || multiple || 1999–2021 || 12 Aug 2021 || 101 || align=left | Disc.: Spacewatch || 
|- id="1999 TT337" bgcolor=#d6d6d6
| 0 ||  || MBA-O || 16.05 || 3.4 km || multiple || 1999–2021 || 09 Sep 2021 || 168 || align=left | Disc.: Spacewatch || 
|- id="1999 TU337" bgcolor=#E9E9E9
| 0 ||  || MBA-M || 17.47 || 1.3 km || multiple || 1999–2021 || 07 Nov 2021 || 126 || align=left | Disc.: SDSS || 
|- id="1999 TV337" bgcolor=#E9E9E9
| 0 ||  || MBA-M || 16.95 || 1.7 km || multiple || 1999–2021 || 07 Nov 2021 || 140 || align=left | Disc.: SDSS || 
|- id="1999 TW337" bgcolor=#E9E9E9
| 0 ||  || MBA-M || 17.0 || 2.2 km || multiple || 1999–2021 || 12 May 2021 || 122 || align=left | Disc.: SDSS || 
|- id="1999 TY337" bgcolor=#E9E9E9
| 0 ||  || MBA-M || 17.6 || 1.3 km || multiple || 1999–2020 || 15 Oct 2020 || 84 || align=left | Disc.: Spacewatch || 
|- id="1999 TZ337" bgcolor=#E9E9E9
| 0 ||  || MBA-M || 17.33 || 1.4 km || multiple || 1999–2021 || 10 Oct 2021 || 100 || align=left | Disc.: SDSS || 
|- id="1999 TB338" bgcolor=#d6d6d6
| 0 ||  || MBA-O || 17.08 || 2.1 km || multiple || 1999–2021 || 07 Oct 2021 || 88 || align=left | Disc.: SDSS || 
|- id="1999 TC338" bgcolor=#fefefe
| 0 ||  || MBA-I || 18.1 || data-sort-value="0.71" | 710 m || multiple || 1999–2021 || 06 Jan 2021 || 90 || align=left | Disc.: Spacewatch || 
|- id="1999 TE338" bgcolor=#fefefe
| 0 ||  || MBA-I || 18.13 || data-sort-value="0.70" | 700 m || multiple || 1999–2021 || 28 Nov 2021 || 138 || align=left | Disc.: SpacewatchAlt.: 2010 OT133 || 
|- id="1999 TG338" bgcolor=#E9E9E9
| 0 ||  || MBA-M || 17.14 || 1.6 km || multiple || 1999–2022 || 25 Jan 2022 || 138 || align=left | Disc.: SDSS || 
|- id="1999 TH338" bgcolor=#E9E9E9
| 0 ||  || MBA-M || 17.46 || 1.4 km || multiple || 1999–2021 || 26 Nov 2021 || 89 || align=left | Disc.: SDSS || 
|- id="1999 TJ338" bgcolor=#fefefe
| 0 ||  || MBA-I || 17.82 || data-sort-value="0.81" | 810 m || multiple || 1999–2021 || 03 Aug 2021 || 99 || align=left | Disc.: SDSS || 
|- id="1999 TK338" bgcolor=#E9E9E9
| 0 ||  || MBA-M || 17.5 || 1.3 km || multiple || 1995–2020 || 23 Sep 2020 || 91 || align=left | Disc.: SDSS || 
|- id="1999 TL338" bgcolor=#fefefe
| 0 ||  || MBA-I || 18.27 || data-sort-value="0.66" | 660 m || multiple || 1999–2021 || 08 Dec 2021 || 88 || align=left | Disc.: Spacewatch || 
|- id="1999 TM338" bgcolor=#E9E9E9
| 0 ||  || MBA-M || 17.3 || 1.9 km || multiple || 1999–2020 || 26 Mar 2020 || 73 || align=left | Disc.: SDSS || 
|- id="1999 TO338" bgcolor=#E9E9E9
| 0 ||  || MBA-M || 17.34 || 1.4 km || multiple || 1999–2021 || 07 Nov 2021 || 84 || align=left | Disc.: SDSS || 
|- id="1999 TP338" bgcolor=#E9E9E9
| 0 ||  || MBA-M || 17.64 || 1.7 km || multiple || 1999–2021 || 09 Sep 2021 || 83 || align=left | Disc.: SDSS || 
|- id="1999 TQ338" bgcolor=#fefefe
| 0 ||  || MBA-I || 18.60 || data-sort-value="0.57" | 570 m || multiple || 1999–2021 || 08 Sep 2021 || 94 || align=left | Disc.: SDSS || 
|- id="1999 TR338" bgcolor=#E9E9E9
| 0 ||  || MBA-M || 18.18 || data-sort-value="0.69" | 690 m || multiple || 1999–2021 || 10 Apr 2021 || 67 || align=left | Disc.: Spacewatch || 
|- id="1999 TT338" bgcolor=#fefefe
| 0 ||  || MBA-I || 18.19 || data-sort-value="0.68" | 680 m || multiple || 1999–2021 || 30 Nov 2021 || 115 || align=left | Disc.: Spacewatch || 
|- id="1999 TU338" bgcolor=#E9E9E9
| 0 ||  || MBA-M || 17.4 || 1.8 km || multiple || 1999–2020 || 16 Mar 2020 || 52 || align=left | Disc.: SDSS || 
|- id="1999 TV338" bgcolor=#d6d6d6
| 0 ||  || MBA-O || 16.5 || 2.8 km || multiple || 1999–2020 || 27 Apr 2020 || 70 || align=left | Disc.: SDSS || 
|- id="1999 TY338" bgcolor=#E9E9E9
| 0 ||  || MBA-M || 17.93 || 1.1 km || multiple || 1999–2021 || 30 Nov 2021 || 117 || align=left | Disc.: SDSS || 
|- id="1999 TA339" bgcolor=#E9E9E9
| 0 ||  || MBA-M || 18.06 || 1.4 km || multiple || 1999–2021 || 31 Aug 2021 || 57 || align=left | Disc.: Spacewatch || 
|- id="1999 TB339" bgcolor=#E9E9E9
| 0 ||  || MBA-M || 16.78 || 2.5 km || multiple || 1999–2021 || 15 Aug 2021 || 99 || align=left | Disc.: SDSS || 
|- id="1999 TC339" bgcolor=#E9E9E9
| 0 ||  || MBA-M || 17.4 || 1.8 km || multiple || 1999–2020 || 22 Apr 2020 || 54 || align=left | Disc.: Spacewatch || 
|- id="1999 TD339" bgcolor=#E9E9E9
| 0 ||  || MBA-M || 17.78 || 1.5 km || multiple || 1999–2021 || 04 Oct 2021 || 86 || align=left | Disc.: SDSS || 
|- id="1999 TE339" bgcolor=#fefefe
| 0 ||  || MBA-I || 18.48 || data-sort-value="0.60" | 600 m || multiple || 1999–2021 || 28 Oct 2021 || 91 || align=left | Disc.: Spacewatch || 
|- id="1999 TF339" bgcolor=#E9E9E9
| 0 ||  || MBA-M || 17.4 || 1.4 km || multiple || 1999–2020 || 12 Dec 2020 || 84 || align=left | Disc.: Spacewatch || 
|- id="1999 TG339" bgcolor=#E9E9E9
| 0 ||  || MBA-M || 17.5 || 1.8 km || multiple || 1999–2020 || 22 Mar 2020 || 43 || align=left | Disc.: SDSS || 
|- id="1999 TH339" bgcolor=#d6d6d6
| 0 ||  || MBA-O || 16.61 || 2.7 km || multiple || 1999–2021 || 02 Oct 2021 || 55 || align=left | Disc.: SDSS || 
|- id="1999 TJ339" bgcolor=#E9E9E9
| 0 ||  || MBA-M || 17.75 || 1.6 km || multiple || 1999–2021 || 12 Aug 2021 || 58 || align=left | Disc.: Spacewatch || 
|- id="1999 TK339" bgcolor=#fefefe
| 0 ||  || MBA-I || 18.50 || data-sort-value="0.59" | 590 m || multiple || 1999–2022 || 24 Jan 2022 || 50 || align=left | Disc.: SDSS || 
|- id="1999 TL339" bgcolor=#E9E9E9
| 0 ||  || MBA-M || 17.2 || 1.1 km || multiple || 1999–2021 || 11 Jan 2021 || 126 || align=left | Disc.: SDSS || 
|- id="1999 TM339" bgcolor=#fefefe
| 1 ||  || MBA-I || 19.1 || data-sort-value="0.45" | 450 m || multiple || 1999–2020 || 11 Oct 2020 || 58 || align=left | Disc.: SDSS || 
|- id="1999 TN339" bgcolor=#d6d6d6
| 0 ||  || MBA-O || 16.53 || 2.8 km || multiple || 1999–2021 || 14 Aug 2021 || 130 || align=left | Disc.: SDSS || 
|- id="1999 TO339" bgcolor=#E9E9E9
| 1 ||  || MBA-M || 17.3 || 1.0 km || multiple || 1999–2021 || 21 Jan 2021 || 103 || align=left | Disc.: SDSS || 
|- id="1999 TP339" bgcolor=#fefefe
| 0 ||  || MBA-I || 17.86 || data-sort-value="0.80" | 800 m || multiple || 1999–2021 || 09 Jul 2021 || 80 || align=left | Disc.: SDSS || 
|- id="1999 TQ339" bgcolor=#fefefe
| 0 ||  || MBA-I || 18.6 || data-sort-value="0.57" | 570 m || multiple || 1999–2018 || 10 Dec 2018 || 34 || align=left | Disc.: SDSS || 
|- id="1999 TR339" bgcolor=#fefefe
| 1 ||  || MBA-I || 18.3 || data-sort-value="0.65" | 650 m || multiple || 1999–2020 || 14 Feb 2020 || 78 || align=left | Disc.: SDSS || 
|- id="1999 TS339" bgcolor=#E9E9E9
| 0 ||  || MBA-M || 17.7 || data-sort-value="0.86" | 860 m || multiple || 1999–2021 || 08 Jan 2021 || 73 || align=left | Disc.: SDSS || 
|- id="1999 TT339" bgcolor=#fefefe
| 1 ||  || MBA-I || 18.14 || data-sort-value="0.70" | 700 m || multiple || 1999–2021 || 17 Apr 2021 || 48 || align=left | Disc.: SDSS || 
|- id="1999 TW339" bgcolor=#E9E9E9
| 0 ||  || MBA-M || 16.8 || 1.3 km || multiple || 1998–2020 || 20 Dec 2020 || 132 || align=left | Disc.: SDSS || 
|- id="1999 TX339" bgcolor=#E9E9E9
| 0 ||  || MBA-M || 17.9 || data-sort-value="0.78" | 780 m || multiple || 1999–2021 || 18 Jan 2021 || 49 || align=left | Disc.: SDSS || 
|- id="1999 TY339" bgcolor=#d6d6d6
| 0 ||  || MBA-O || 17.05 || 2.2 km || multiple || 1999–2021 || 06 Nov 2021 || 47 || align=left | Disc.: Spacewatch || 
|- id="1999 TZ339" bgcolor=#E9E9E9
| 2 ||  || MBA-M || 18.7 || data-sort-value="0.54" | 540 m || multiple || 1999–2019 || 03 Oct 2019 || 58 || align=left | Disc.: Spacewatch || 
|- id="1999 TA340" bgcolor=#d6d6d6
| 0 ||  || MBA-O || 17.6 || 1.7 km || multiple || 1999–2021 || 07 Apr 2021 || 35 || align=left | Disc.: SDSS || 
|- id="1999 TB340" bgcolor=#fefefe
| 1 ||  || MBA-I || 18.4 || data-sort-value="0.62" | 620 m || multiple || 1999–2018 || 10 Dec 2018 || 37 || align=left | Disc.: Spacewatch || 
|- id="1999 TC340" bgcolor=#fefefe
| 0 ||  || MBA-I || 18.9 || data-sort-value="0.49" | 490 m || multiple || 1999–2019 || 07 Jul 2019 || 53 || align=left | Disc.: Spacewatch || 
|- id="1999 TD340" bgcolor=#fefefe
| 0 ||  || MBA-I || 18.5 || data-sort-value="0.59" | 590 m || multiple || 1999–2021 || 18 Jan 2021 || 47 || align=left | Disc.: Spacewatch || 
|- id="1999 TE340" bgcolor=#fefefe
| 0 ||  || HUN || 18.7 || data-sort-value="0.54" | 540 m || multiple || 1999–2020 || 24 Jan 2020 || 44 || align=left | Disc.: SDSS || 
|- id="1999 TF340" bgcolor=#d6d6d6
| 0 ||  || MBA-O || 16.1 || 3.4 km || multiple || 1999–2020 || 27 Apr 2020 || 77 || align=left | Disc.: SpacewatchAlt.: 2010 KW54 || 
|- id="1999 TG340" bgcolor=#fefefe
| 1 ||  || MBA-I || 18.7 || data-sort-value="0.54" | 540 m || multiple || 1999–2020 || 11 Oct 2020 || 76 || align=left | Disc.: SDSS || 
|- id="1999 TH340" bgcolor=#fefefe
| 2 ||  || MBA-I || 18.4 || data-sort-value="0.62" | 620 m || multiple || 1999–2018 || 08 Nov 2018 || 27 || align=left | Disc.: Spacewatch || 
|- id="1999 TJ340" bgcolor=#fefefe
| 0 ||  || MBA-I || 18.39 || data-sort-value="0.62" | 620 m || multiple || 1999–2021 || 04 May 2021 || 34 || align=left | Disc.: Spacewatch || 
|- id="1999 TK340" bgcolor=#d6d6d6
| 0 ||  || MBA-O || 17.2 || 2.0 km || multiple || 1999–2020 || 05 Nov 2020 || 61 || align=left | Disc.: SDSS || 
|- id="1999 TL340" bgcolor=#d6d6d6
| 0 ||  || MBA-O || 16.60 || 2.7 km || multiple || 1999–2021 || 06 Nov 2021 || 95 || align=left | Disc.: SDSS || 
|- id="1999 TN340" bgcolor=#E9E9E9
| 0 ||  || MBA-M || 17.2 || 2.0 km || multiple || 1999–2021 || 15 Jun 2021 || 98 || align=left | Disc.: SDSS || 
|- id="1999 TO340" bgcolor=#d6d6d6
| 0 ||  || MBA-O || 16.4 || 2.9 km || multiple || 1999–2018 || 05 Nov 2018 || 66 || align=left | Disc.: Spacewatch || 
|- id="1999 TP340" bgcolor=#fefefe
| 0 ||  || MBA-I || 18.2 || data-sort-value="0.68" | 680 m || multiple || 1999–2020 || 23 Oct 2020 || 80 || align=left | Disc.: Spacewatch || 
|- id="1999 TR340" bgcolor=#d6d6d6
| 0 ||  || MBA-O || 17.09 || 2.1 km || multiple || 1999–2022 || 25 Jan 2022 || 99 || align=left | Disc.: SDSS || 
|- id="1999 TS340" bgcolor=#d6d6d6
| 0 ||  || MBA-O || 16.80 || 2.4 km || multiple || 1999–2021 || 23 Nov 2021 || 81 || align=left | Disc.: SDSS || 
|- id="1999 TU340" bgcolor=#d6d6d6
| 0 ||  || MBA-O || 16.62 || 2.6 km || multiple || 1999–2021 || 14 Sep 2021 || 80 || align=left | Disc.: SDSSAlt.: 2010 MM103 || 
|- id="1999 TV340" bgcolor=#E9E9E9
| 0 ||  || MBA-M || 17.09 || 2.1 km || multiple || 1999–2021 || 13 Apr 2021 || 96 || align=left | Disc.: SDSS || 
|- id="1999 TW340" bgcolor=#fefefe
| 0 ||  || MBA-I || 18.26 || data-sort-value="0.66" | 660 m || multiple || 1999–2021 || 07 Nov 2021 || 87 || align=left | Disc.: SDSS || 
|- id="1999 TX340" bgcolor=#fefefe
| 0 ||  || MBA-I || 18.32 || data-sort-value="0.64" | 640 m || multiple || 1995–2021 || 06 Nov 2021 || 95 || align=left | Disc.: Spacewatch || 
|- id="1999 TY340" bgcolor=#fefefe
| 0 ||  || MBA-I || 18.3 || data-sort-value="0.65" | 650 m || multiple || 1999–2020 || 27 Apr 2020 || 55 || align=left | Disc.: SDSS || 
|- id="1999 TZ340" bgcolor=#fefefe
| 0 ||  || MBA-I || 18.45 || data-sort-value="0.61" | 610 m || multiple || 1999–2022 || 25 Jan 2022 || 74 || align=left | Disc.: SDSS || 
|- id="1999 TA341" bgcolor=#fefefe
| 0 ||  || MBA-I || 18.18 || data-sort-value="0.69" | 690 m || multiple || 1999–2021 || 07 Nov 2021 || 101 || align=left | Disc.: SDSS || 
|- id="1999 TB341" bgcolor=#E9E9E9
| 0 ||  || MBA-M || 17.3 || 1.0 km || multiple || 1999–2021 || 15 Jan 2021 || 64 || align=left | Disc.: SDSS || 
|- id="1999 TC341" bgcolor=#E9E9E9
| 0 ||  || MBA-M || 17.5 || data-sort-value="0.94" | 940 m || multiple || 1999–2020 || 09 Dec 2020 || 56 || align=left | Disc.: Spacewatch || 
|- id="1999 TD341" bgcolor=#fefefe
| 0 ||  || MBA-I || 18.6 || data-sort-value="0.57" | 570 m || multiple || 1999–2017 || 10 Nov 2017 || 42 || align=left | Disc.: Spacewatch || 
|- id="1999 TE341" bgcolor=#fefefe
| 0 ||  || MBA-I || 18.61 || data-sort-value="0.56" | 560 m || multiple || 1999–2021 || 15 Apr 2021 || 48 || align=left | Disc.: SDSS || 
|- id="1999 TF341" bgcolor=#E9E9E9
| 0 ||  || MBA-M || 17.47 || 1.8 km || multiple || 1999–2021 || 05 Jun 2021 || 62 || align=left | Disc.: SDSS || 
|- id="1999 TG341" bgcolor=#fefefe
| 0 ||  || HUN || 19.0 || data-sort-value="0.47" | 470 m || multiple || 1999–2021 || 06 Jan 2021 || 48 || align=left | Disc.: Spacewatch || 
|- id="1999 TH341" bgcolor=#E9E9E9
| 0 ||  || MBA-M || 17.1 || 2.1 km || multiple || 1999–2019 || 12 Jan 2019 || 43 || align=left | Disc.: Spacewatch || 
|- id="1999 TJ341" bgcolor=#E9E9E9
| 0 ||  || MBA-M || 17.83 || 1.1 km || multiple || 1999–2021 || 07 Nov 2021 || 58 || align=left | Disc.: SDSS || 
|- id="1999 TK341" bgcolor=#fefefe
| 0 ||  || MBA-I || 18.44 || data-sort-value="0.61" | 610 m || multiple || 1999–2022 || 25 Jan 2022 || 66 || align=left | Disc.: Spacewatch || 
|- id="1999 TL341" bgcolor=#d6d6d6
| 0 ||  || MBA-O || 17.17 || 2.0 km || multiple || 1999–2021 || 29 Nov 2021 || 66 || align=left | Disc.: SDSS || 
|- id="1999 TM341" bgcolor=#d6d6d6
| 0 ||  || MBA-O || 16.72 || 2.5 km || multiple || 1999–2021 || 01 Nov 2021 || 110 || align=left | Disc.: SDSS || 
|- id="1999 TN341" bgcolor=#C2FFFF
| 0 ||  || JT || 13.91 || 9.2 km || multiple || 1999–2021 || 11 Aug 2021 || 128 || align=left | Disc.: SDSSTrojan camp (L5)Alt.: 2010 HJ121 || 
|- id="1999 TO341" bgcolor=#E9E9E9
| 0 ||  || MBA-M || 17.68 || 1.6 km || multiple || 1999–2021 || 30 Jun 2021 || 68 || align=left | Disc.: Spacewatch || 
|- id="1999 TP341" bgcolor=#d6d6d6
| 0 ||  || MBA-O || 15.90 || 3.7 km || multiple || 1999–2021 || 28 Oct 2021 || 146 || align=left | Disc.: SDSSAlt.: 2010 MS73 || 
|- id="1999 TQ341" bgcolor=#E9E9E9
| 0 ||  || MBA-M || 16.9 || 1.2 km || multiple || 1999–2021 || 17 Jan 2021 || 160 || align=left | Disc.: Spacewatch || 
|- id="1999 TR341" bgcolor=#E9E9E9
| 0 ||  || MBA-M || 17.52 || 1.3 km || multiple || 1999–2021 || 07 Oct 2021 || 66 || align=left | Disc.: SDSS || 
|- id="1999 TT341" bgcolor=#d6d6d6
| 0 ||  || MBA-O || 16.85 || 2.4 km || multiple || 1999–2022 || 24 Jan 2022 || 114 || align=left | Disc.: SDSS || 
|- id="1999 TU341" bgcolor=#d6d6d6
| 0 ||  || MBA-O || 17.0 || 2.2 km || multiple || 1999–2019 || 29 Oct 2019 || 61 || align=left | Disc.: SDSS || 
|- id="1999 TV341" bgcolor=#d6d6d6
| 0 ||  || MBA-O || 16.87 || 2.4 km || multiple || 1999–2021 || 08 Nov 2021 || 82 || align=left | Disc.: Spacewatch || 
|- id="1999 TW341" bgcolor=#E9E9E9
| 0 ||  || MBA-M || 17.56 || 1.3 km || multiple || 1999–2022 || 25 Jan 2022 || 75 || align=left | Disc.: SDSS || 
|- id="1999 TX341" bgcolor=#fefefe
| 0 ||  || MBA-I || 18.55 || data-sort-value="0.58" | 580 m || multiple || 1999–2021 || 24 Nov 2021 || 54 || align=left | Disc.: SDSS || 
|- id="1999 TY341" bgcolor=#d6d6d6
| 0 ||  || MBA-O || 16.69 || 2.6 km || multiple || 1999–2021 || 09 Dec 2021 || 65 || align=left | Disc.: SDSS || 
|- id="1999 TZ341" bgcolor=#E9E9E9
| 0 ||  || MBA-M || 17.47 || 1.3 km || multiple || 1999–2021 || 30 Nov 2021 || 73 || align=left | Disc.: SDSS || 
|- id="1999 TA342" bgcolor=#fefefe
| 0 ||  || MBA-I || 18.50 || data-sort-value="0.59" | 590 m || multiple || 1999–2021 || 27 Jun 2021 || 40 || align=left | Disc.: Spacewatch || 
|- id="1999 TB342" bgcolor=#d6d6d6
| 0 ||  || MBA-O || 17.1 || 2.1 km || multiple || 1999–2020 || 07 Oct 2020 || 43 || align=left | Disc.: SDSS || 
|- id="1999 TC342" bgcolor=#E9E9E9
| 3 ||  || MBA-M || 18.5 || data-sort-value="0.59" | 590 m || multiple || 1999–2015 || 17 Aug 2015 || 25 || align=left | Disc.: Spacewatch || 
|- id="1999 TD342" bgcolor=#E9E9E9
| 0 ||  || MBA-M || 17.58 || 1.3 km || multiple || 1999–2021 || 08 Nov 2021 || 89 || align=left | Disc.: SDSS || 
|- id="1999 TE342" bgcolor=#d6d6d6
| 0 ||  || MBA-O || 16.35 || 3.0 km || multiple || 1999–2021 || 05 Nov 2021 || 150 || align=left | Disc.: SDSS || 
|- id="1999 TF342" bgcolor=#d6d6d6
| 0 ||  || MBA-O || 17.27 || 2.0 km || multiple || 1999–2022 || 24 Jan 2022 || 53 || align=left | Disc.: SDSS || 
|- id="1999 TG342" bgcolor=#d6d6d6
| 0 ||  || MBA-O || 16.6 || 2.7 km || multiple || 1999–2020 || 05 Nov 2020 || 94 || align=left | Disc.: Spacewatch || 
|- id="1999 TH342" bgcolor=#d6d6d6
| 0 ||  || MBA-O || 17.1 || 2.1 km || multiple || 1999–2020 || 14 Dec 2020 || 36 || align=left | Disc.: SDSS || 
|- id="1999 TJ342" bgcolor=#E9E9E9
| 1 ||  || MBA-M || 18.6 || 1.1 km || multiple || 1999–2017 || 13 Sep 2017 || 23 || align=left | Disc.: SDSS || 
|- id="1999 TK342" bgcolor=#fefefe
| 0 ||  || MBA-I || 18.0 || data-sort-value="0.75" | 750 m || multiple || 1999–2020 || 06 Dec 2020 || 120 || align=left | Disc.: SDSS || 
|- id="1999 TL342" bgcolor=#d6d6d6
| 0 ||  || MBA-O || 16.64 || 2.6 km || multiple || 1999–2021 || 28 Sep 2021 || 62 || align=left | Disc.: Spacewatch || 
|- id="1999 TM342" bgcolor=#E9E9E9
| 0 ||  || MBA-M || 17.7 || data-sort-value="0.86" | 860 m || multiple || 1995–2021 || 16 Jan 2021 || 81 || align=left | Disc.: Spacewatch || 
|- id="1999 TN342" bgcolor=#C2FFFF
| 0 ||  || JT || 14.31 || 7.7 km || multiple || 1999–2021 || 05 Aug 2021 || 133 || align=left | Disc.: SDSSTrojan camp (L5) || 
|- id="1999 TO342" bgcolor=#E9E9E9
| 0 ||  || MBA-M || 17.82 || 1.5 km || multiple || 1999–2021 || 13 Sep 2021 || 61 || align=left | Disc.: SDSS || 
|- id="1999 TP342" bgcolor=#fefefe
| 1 ||  || MBA-I || 18.5 || data-sort-value="0.59" | 590 m || multiple || 1999–2020 || 08 Oct 2020 || 64 || align=left | Disc.: SpacewatchAdded on 13 September 2020 || 
|- id="1999 TQ342" bgcolor=#E9E9E9
| 0 ||  || MBA-M || 17.90 || 1.1 km || multiple || 1999–2021 || 08 Dec 2021 || 54 || align=left | Disc.: SpacewatchAdded on 19 October 2020 || 
|- id="1999 TR342" bgcolor=#d6d6d6
| 0 ||  || MBA-O || 16.91 || 2.3 km || multiple || 1999–2021 || 08 Dec 2021 || 68 || align=left | Disc.: SpacewatchAdded on 19 October 2020 || 
|- id="1999 TS342" bgcolor=#fefefe
| 2 ||  || MBA-I || 19.6 || data-sort-value="0.36" | 360 m || multiple || 1999–2020 || 22 Sep 2020 || 34 || align=left | Disc.: SDSSAdded on 17 January 2021 || 
|- id="1999 TU342" bgcolor=#d6d6d6
| 0 ||  || MBA-O || 17.21 || 2.0 km || multiple || 1999–2021 || 01 Dec 2021 || 54 || align=left | Disc.: SpacewatchAdded on 17 January 2021 || 
|- id="1999 TA343" bgcolor=#E9E9E9
| 0 ||  || MBA-M || 18.0 || data-sort-value="0.75" | 750 m || multiple || 1999–2020 || 16 Dec 2020 || 35 || align=left | Disc.: SpacewatchAdded on 9 March 2021 || 
|- id="1999 TB343" bgcolor=#E9E9E9
| 1 ||  || MBA-M || 18.4 || data-sort-value="0.62" | 620 m || multiple || 1999–2020 || 15 Oct 2020 || 27 || align=left | Disc.: SDSSAdded on 11 May 2021 || 
|- id="1999 TF343" bgcolor=#E9E9E9
| 0 ||  || MBA-M || 18.51 || data-sort-value="0.83" | 830 m || multiple || 1999–2021 || 07 Nov 2021 || 43 || align=left | Disc.: SDSSAdded on 30 September 2021 || 
|- id="1999 TJ343" bgcolor=#d6d6d6
| 2 ||  || MBA-O || 17.4 || 1.8 km || multiple || 1999–2014 || 20 Sep 2014 || 17 || align=left | Disc.: SpacewatchAdded on 29 January 2022 || 
|}
back to top

References 
 

Lists of unnumbered minor planets